= Brazilian ironclad Mariz e Barros =

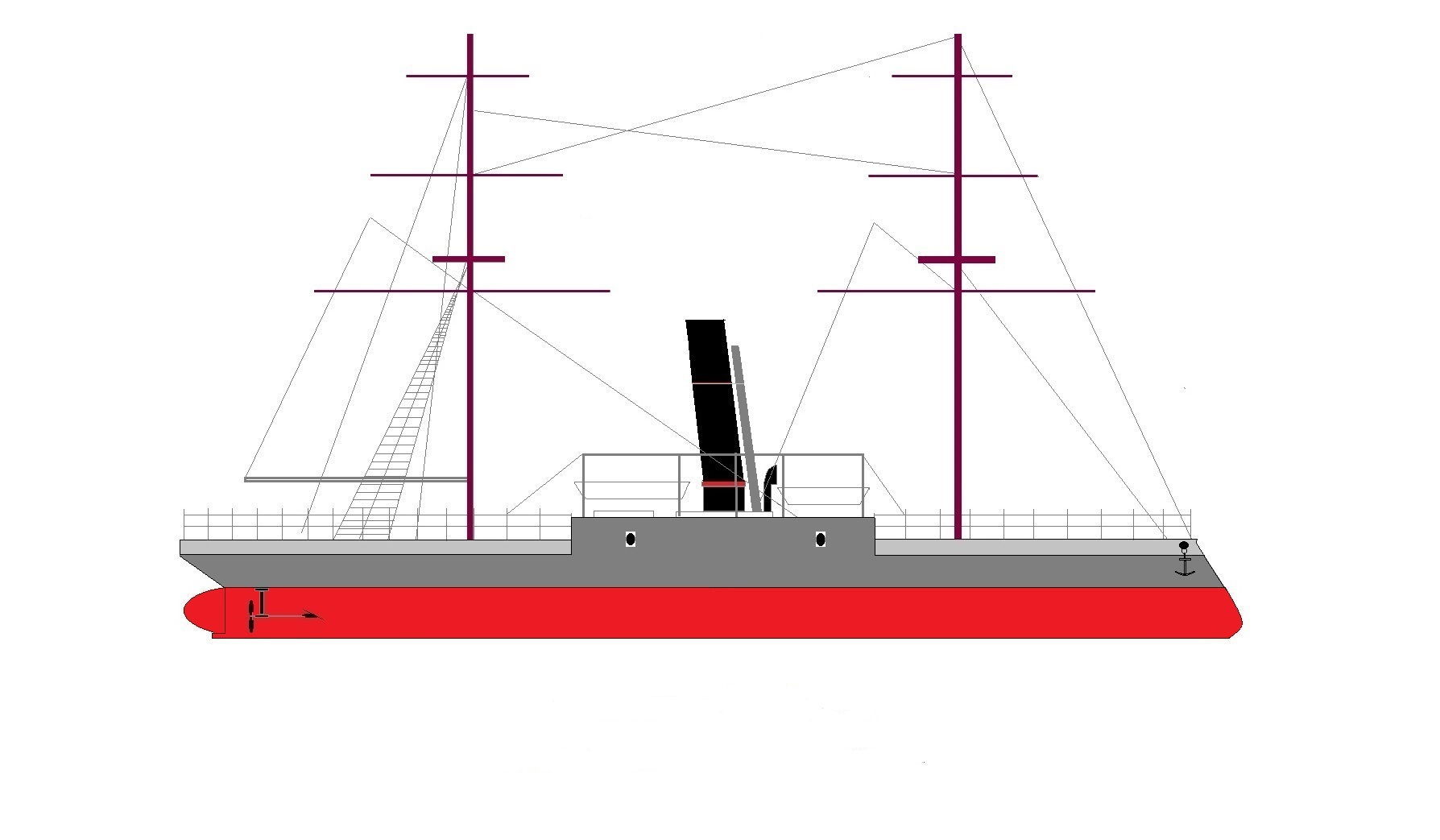

History

Empire of Brazil
- Name: Mariz e Barros
- Namesake: Antônio Carlos de Mariz e Barros
- Operator: Imperial Brazilian Navy
- Builder: J. and G. Rennie
- Launched: 1866
- Commissioned: 23 July 1866
- Decommissioned: 23 July 1897

General characteristics
- Class & type: Mariz e Barros-class Corvette
- Displacement: 2,640 lb (1,196 t)
- Length: 191 ft (58 m)
- Beam: 36.1 ft (11.0 m)
- Draft: 8.20 ft (2.50 m)
- Propulsion: Steam engines coupled to two shafts; 600 hp (450 kW)
- Speed: 9 knots (17 km/h; 10 mph)
- Troops: 125 officers and enlisted men
- Armament: 2 × 7-inch 120-pounder Whitworth naval guns; 2 × 68-pounder guns
- Armor: 76 mm - 114 mm Belt

Mariz e Barros was an ironclad, or armored corvette, of the Mariz e Barros class operated by the Imperial Brazilian Navy. The ship was originally built for the Paraguayan Navy, but was not delivered as the country was unable to pay due to the Paraguayan war. The Empire of Brazil eventually acquired her in 1865, and she was renamed Mariz e Barros in honor of Lieutenant-Captain Antônio Carlos de Mariz e Barros, who died in battle.

Mariz e Barros participated in several battles of the Paraguayan War, such as the attack on the Curupaití fort on February 2, 1867. On August 15, she joined the fleet that successfully forced the passage of the fort, in an action that lasted about two hours. She helped the squadron during the Passage of Humaitá on February 19, 1868, and when the battleships Cabral and Lima Barros were assaulted on March 2. Later that year, the ship participated in the attack and transposition of the Angostura fort.

In 1869, the large battleships such as the Mariz e Barros, were no longer needed in the conflict and they were sent to the various naval districts along the Brazilian coast. The battleship was sent to the 2nd Naval District, which patrolled the coast from the border between the provinces of Rio de Janeiro and Espírito Santo to the city of Mossoró, in Rio Grande do Norte. She was decommissioned on July 23, 1897.

== Characteristics ==
Mariz e Barros was 191 ft. (58 m) long, with a beam of 36.1 ft. (11 m) and a draught of 8.20 ft. (2.5 m). She displaced 1,196 long tons, and had a pair of steam engines with each driving a propeller. The corvette produced a total of 600 hp which allowed her a maximum speed of 9 knots. The ship carried 140 tons of coal, but there is no record of range or endurance. Her crew consisted of 125 officers and enlisted men.

The corvette was equipped with two 120-pounder Whitworth naval guns and two 68-pounder guns. The belt on the wrought iron waterline ranged from 114 mm at midship to 76 mm at the ends.

== Building ==
The Paraguayan government ordered five battleships from European shipyards, four British (Meduza, Triton, Bellona, and Minerva) and one French (Nemesis). In 1865, the Brazilian government made credits available to the navy for the purchase of these ships, since Paraguay was no longer able to pay for them due to the Paraguayan War. In the imperial armada, the battleship Triton was baptized Mariz e Barros, in honor of Senior lieutenant Antônio Carlos Mariz e Barros, son of former Navy Minister Joaquim José Inácio. Mariz e Barros died of complications after being wounded by shrapnel caused by a projectile coming from the battery of the Itapirú fortress that hit the battleship Tamandaré, which he commanded, and that also victimized 33 others who garrisoned it.

Mariz e Barros was built at the English shipyard J. and G. Rennie and acquired by Brazil in 1865. She belonged to the same class as the ironclad Herval. The ship arrived in Brazil on July 8, 1866, and was incorporated into the Navy on the 23rd, under the command of Captain lieutenant Silvino José de Carvalho Rocha.

== Service ==
The first contact of the Mariz e Barros with the Paraguayan War took place on February 2, 1867, when the ship, seven other battleships, and four wooden boats, a fleet under command of Vice Admiral Joaquim José Inácio, attacked the fort of Curupaití, with support from allied gunners from the Curuzú fort (seized months earlier), and also from the 48th Corps of Homeland Volunteers. Simultaneously, a fleet of six gunboats and speedboats under the leadership of Chief of Division Elisiário dos Santos, from another position in the fortress, dropped about 300 bombs on the target. There is no record of casualties on the Mariz e Barros, but there were at least 14 in the navy which included the death of the captain of the battleship Silvado. Among the Paraguayans, there were many casualties and the fort commander General Jose E. Diaz was seriously wounded. Curupaití was again attacked by Ignacio's fleet on May 29.

After these operations and some others carried out by other battleships, Mariz e Barros joined the fleet and was ordered to force its way through the fort on August 15. The imperial squadron was organized as follows: the Commander-in-Chief of the operation was Vice Admiral Joaquim José Inácio. At the head of the squadron would be the 3rd Battleship Division, under the command of Frigate Captain Joaquim Rodrigues da Costa, composed of the Brasil, Tamandaré, Colombo, Bahia, and Mariz e Barros. In the rear would be the 1st Battleship Division, under command of Captain Francisco Cordeiro Torres e Alvim, composed of the Cabral, Barroso, Herval, Silvado, and Lima Barros. The division under Chief of Division Elisiário Antônio dos Santos composed of the wooden ships Recife, Beberibe, Parnaíba, Iguatemi, Ypiranga, Magé, Forte de Coimbra and Pedro Afonso supplied suppressive fire. In contrast, the Paraguayan defenders were organized as follows: under the Commander-in-chief Colonel Paulino Alén, in charge of the Curupaiti defense, there were batteries composed of 29 cannons, one of 80-pounder (El Cristiano), 28 of 32-pounder and 68-pounder, a garrison composed of 300 artillerymen supported by the 4th battalion of 800 men, and a squadron of cavalry.

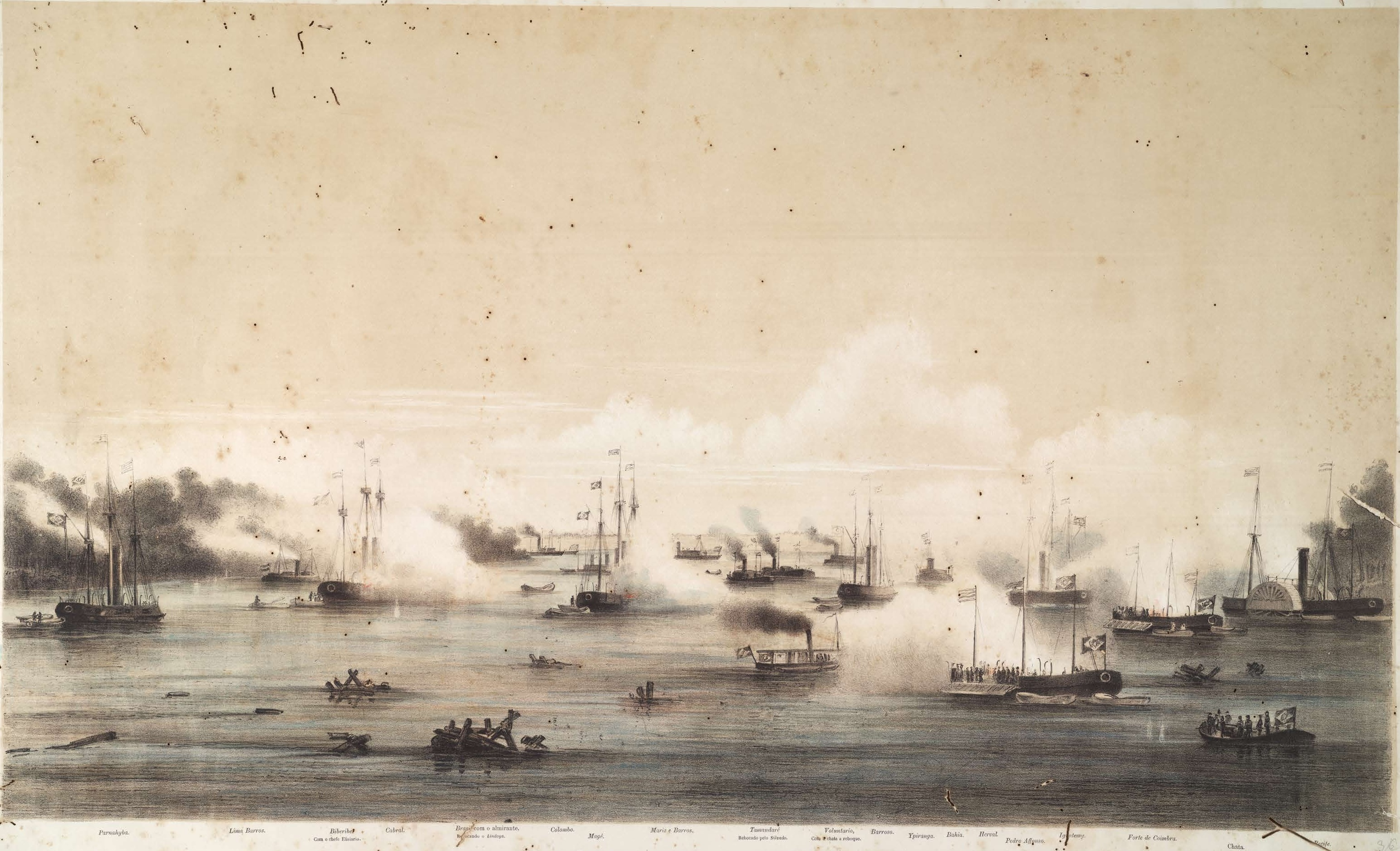
Transposition of Curupaití on August 15, 1867

Under the command of Lieutenant Captain Neto de Mendonça, the Mariz e Barros began the passage at 6:40 a.m. on the 15th. To the total surprise of the Paraguayans, the passage of the imperial battleships took place close to their cannons instead of the more distant channel, however, this course was full of obstacles. The proximity of the ships to the cannons allowed the firing to occur at close range, impacting all the projectiles fired by them. Despite this, the imperial squadron managed to pass through without much damage to the ships and with few casualties among the crews. The transposition lasted about two hours and left three dead and 22 wounded Brazilians.

The armored squadron's next obstacle was the Fortress of Humaitá. This passage occurred on February 19, 1868, with Mariz e Barros acting in the protection of the hospitals of Porto Elisiário, which was between the two forts on the right bank of the Paraguay River. A few days later, on March 2, the ironclad was at the mouth of the Rio do Ouro, which flows into Paraguay, together with others that had passed Curupaití, when there was an attempt to board the vessels Cabral and Lima Barros by Paraguayans in canoes. However, this was thwarted by the rapid arrival of the battleships Herval and Silvado, which helped to defeat them. The Mariz e Barros and Brasil arrived soon after, managing to subdue the last enemies. About a month later, the Mariz e Barros contributed to the bombardment of Humaitá in preparation for a major attack by the fleet and allied ground forces on the fortress that would occur in July.

A second passage through the fortress was planned to reinforce the fleet that had transported it in February, due to information that the Paraguayans planned to approach this forward division with four steamboats that were left from their squadron and to have a larger naval force to operate in the Tebiquary river where it was known that there was another fortification. The battleships chosen for the passage were the Cabral, Silvado, and Piauí. The crossing took place on July 21, with the Cabral in the lead, but due to the ship's poor steering, it ended up ramming the Lima Barros, which was acting as support and had to stop for repair. Silvado and Piauí managed to pass through, and Cabral did so sometime later. In this operation, the Mariz e Barros contributed by providing suppression fire.

In early October, the fleet began an attack on the Angostura fort. On the 1st, some battleships forced their way through and other ships bombarded the fortified line that bordered the Piquissiri stream. Between the 5th and 28th, the stronghold would be heavily attacked by Brazilian ships. The Mariz e Barros participated in the action only on November 19, when she fired several shots against the fort's batteries, with the support of other vessels. The armored corvette returned fire to the defensive position on December 9. On that occasion, the Paraguayans returned heavy bombardment against the Mariz e Barros, which resulted in the death of Captain Augusto Neto de Mendonça and 12 wounded among the crew. Sometime after this action, the Mariz e Barros was ahead of the fort. On the 16th, the corvette retraced her steps, forcing the transposition down the river. Three days later, she again forced Angostura's passage with support from the Silvado, which had also retreated days earlier. Finally, the Paraguayans defending the fort surrendered to Allied forces on the 30th.

After the conquest of Asunción, on January 1, 1869, the already worn-out large battleships, such as the Mariz e Barros, were no longer of much use in the conflict, with naval fighting taking place, from then on, in small, very narrow streams. The ships were called back to Rio de Janeiro, where they underwent major repair work. In the early 1870s, the imperial naval command began to distribute the battleships to the various naval districts to defend Brazil's ports. Mariz e Barros and her sister ship Herval were assigned to the 2nd Naval District, which patrolled the coast from the border between the provinces of Rio de Janeiro and Espírito Santo to the city of Mossoró, in Rio Grande do Norte. There are few records of Mariz e Barros after her last commission. In 1884, she was transformed into a floating battery to defend the Ladário Marine Arsenal in the province of Mato Grosso. Finally, the ship was deactivated on July 23, 1897.

== See also ==
- List of ships of the Brazilian Navy

== Bibliography ==
- Barros, Aldeir Isael Faxina (2018). "A Segunda Passagem de Humaitá" (PDF). Navigator. 14 (27): 45–57. ISSN 0100-1248. Archived from the original (PDF) on 2022-02-12.
- Branfill-Cook, Roger (2018). River Gunboats: An Illustrated Encyclopaedia. Seaforth Publishing. ISBN 978-1-84832-365-0.
- Donato, Hernâni (1996). Dicionário das Batalhas Brasileiras (2nd ed.). Instituição Brasileira de Difusão Cultural. ISBN 85-348-0034-0.
- Lyon, Hugh (1979). "Brazil". In Chesneau, Roger & Kolesnik, Eugene M. (eds.). Conway's All the World's Fighting Ships 1860–1905. Conway Maritime Press. ISBN 0-85177-133-5.
- Martini, Fernando Ribas de (2014). Construir navios é preciso, persistir não é preciso: a construção naval militar no Brasil entre 1850 e 1910, na esteira da Revolução Industrial (PDF). Biblioteca Digital USP (Thesis). University of São Paulo. doi:10.11606/D.8.2014.tde-23012015-103524.
- Silverstone, Paul H. (1984). Directory of the World's Capital Ships. Hippocrene Books. ISBN 0-88254-979-0.
