= Passage of Curupayty (1867) =

Part of the Paraguayan War

1st Passage of Curupayty
- Part of the Humaitá campaign
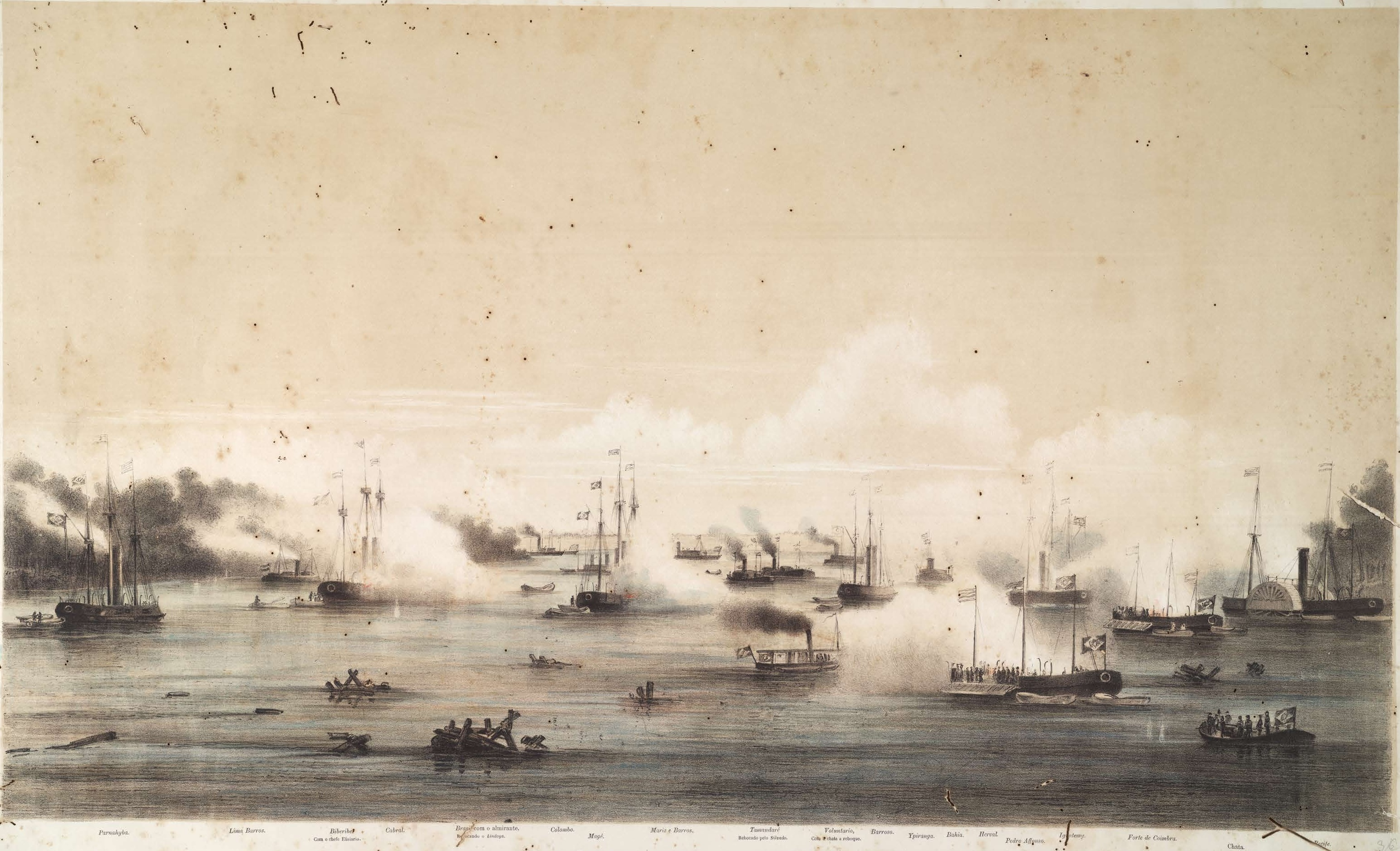
- Passage of Curupaiti by Júlio Raison.
Date	15 August 1867
Location	Paraguay River, Curupayty Fort, Paraguay
Result	Brazilian Navy/Allied victory

Belligerents
Empire of Brazil; Argentina; Uruguay	Paraguay

Commanders and leaders
Joaquim José Inácio	(Paraguay) Solano López

Strength
18 Warships; 3 Flat-bottomed boat	Curupayty Fort with 35 cannons

Casualties and losses
1 damaged warship 25 casualties	1 dead, 2 wounded

The passage of Curupayty was an allied naval operation carried out on 15 August 1867, in the context of the Paraguayan War, which aimed to force the passage of Brazilian battleships against the defensive fortifications installed in the Curupayty fort on the banks of the Paraguay river. There was a second crossing on 13 February 1868 with a fleet of armored monitors destined to join the fleet that had crossed first to form the squadron responsible for forcing the Passage of Humaitá.

== The crossing ==
The difficulties faced by the allies were enormous. The war was already in its third year and they were trapped in a small area in southwest Paraguay, largely due to the disaster that had occurred about a year earlier in the Battle of Curupayty. An advertising victory was urgent to boost troops' morale. Humaitá was the main focus but Curupaiti was on the way.

The high command of the Imperial Navy had considered forcing the passage over Curupaiti and Humaitá but considered it a practically impossible feat. Curupaiti was a group of fortifications and trenches, some kilometers downstream from the fortress of Humaitá, and part of the defensive complex of Humaitá.

On August 15, 1867, at 6:40 am, the Brazilian Warships went into action. They were:

Division	Ship	Commander
2nd Division (Rodrigues da Costa)	Ironclad Brasil	Salgado
	Armored corvette Mariz e Barros	Neves de Mendonça
	Ironclad Tamandaré	Elisiário Barbosa
	Ironclad Colombo	Bernardino de Queiroz
	Armored monitor Bahia (flagship)	Pereira dos Santos
1st Division (Tôrres e Alvim)	Ironclad Cabral	Gerônimo Gonçalves
	Ironclad Barroso	Silveira da Mota
	Ironclad Herval	Mimede Simões
	Ironclad Silvado	Macedo Coimbra
	Ironclad Lima Barros (flagship)	Garsino de Sá

At this point, the river had two channels. One was deeper, but it was closer to the enemy batteries, and the current was stronger. In the other channel, the risk of stranding was very great; in addition, a Paraguayan defector claimed that torpedoes had been placed there recently. Inácio chose to follow the channel closest to the batteries, and his choice was correct. While the wooden vessels of the imperial navy suppressed fire, the warships crossed Curupaiti. Each ship took about 40 minutes to pass.

Some ships were badly damaged. A shot penetrated the Tamandaré through one of its hatches, killing or injuring 14 of its crew. His engine had been damaged and stopped, leaving them adrift under the arms of the fort; he was rescued by Silvado, who threw a cable at them and took them in tow.Tamandaré commander Elisário Barbosa lost his left arm. According to Commander Kennedy, the accident with the Tamandaré forced Colombo, who was behind, to stop the engines to avoid a collision between the boats. The strong current placed them side by side, making maneuverability impossible. Colombo approached the Paraguayan cannons, which caused serious damage before he could leave his dangerous position. There were 25 Brazilian casualties including 3 dead. Warships, taking the channel closest to the Paraguayan cannons, escaped a more serious danger, as soon after the passage several torpedoes were found in the other channel.
