= Mariz =

Mariz may refer to:

- Mariz (parish), now Creixomil e Mariz, in Barcelos, Portugal
- A parish in Guitiriz, Lugo, Galicia, Spain
- A parish in Chantada, Lugo, Galicia, Spain
- Mariz (river), a river of Galicia

== People ==
- Mariz (surname), Portuguese surname
- Mariz (name), list of people with the name

== See also ==
- Brazilian ship Mariz e Barros
