= Mariz (surname) =

Mariz is the name of a Portuguese and Brazilian noble family. Notable people with the surname include:

- Ana Elisa de Mariz e Barros (1831-1922), Brazilian noblewoman, Baroness of Passagem
- Angélica de Mariz Sarmento (c.1670–1715), Portuguese noblewoman, court lady to Queen of Portugal D. Maria Sophia of Neuburg (1666-1699) and governess of Infante Manuel, Count of Ourém (1697-1766)
- Antônio Mariz (1937–1995), Brazilian lawyer and politician, 44th governor of the State of Paraíba
- Dom António de Mariz (1536–1584), Portuguese nobleman and one of the founders of Rio de Janeiro in 1565
- António de Mariz Carneiro (fl. 1623–1642), Portuguese nobleman, official cosmographer to the Portuguese crown
- Antônio de Mariz Loureiro (1643–1657), grandson of Dom Antônio de Mariz, 1st bishop of Rio de Janeiro
- Antônio Carlos de Mariz e Barros (1835–1866), son of admiral Joaquim José Inácio, Viscount of Inhaúma, Brazilian military officer and hero of the War of the Triple Alliance. Several warships of the Brazilian navy bear his name
- António Luís Maria de Mariz Sarmento (1745–1822), Portuguese nobleman and officer, 1st Baron of Andaluz and 1st Viscount of Andaluz
- Augusto Duarte Rozeira de Mariz (1946), Portuguese politician and author, founding member of the Partido Socialista (Portugal)
- Cecília de Mariz, fictitious character in the novel The Guarani (1857) by Brazilian author José de Alencar, a foundational text of Brazilian Romanticism, adapted for opera (Il Guarany by Antônio Carlos Gomes), film and comics
- Dinarte Mariz (1903–1984), Brazilian politician, 39th governor of the State of Rio Grande do Norte
- Ivan Mariz (1910–1982), Brazilian footballer
- Joaquim de Mariz (1847–1916), Portuguese doctor and botanist
- José Alves de Mariz (1844-1912), 36th bishop of Bragança e Miranda (1885-1912)
- Luiz Gonzaga de Mariz (1893-c1960), Jesuit, founder of the Orquestra Sinfônica da Bahia (OSBA) in 1943
- Pedro de Mariz (1550–1615), Portuguese librarian, historian and author of the first biography of Portuguese kings with their portraits (Diálogos de varia história) and first biography of Luís de Camões (1613)
- Pedro Homem de Mariz (1674-?), Portuguese diplomat, negotiator of the Exchange of the Princesses (1729)
- Pedro de Mariz de Sousa Sarmento (c1745-1822), Vice Admiral of the Portuguese Navy
- Wanderley Mariz (1940–2020), Brazilian politician and lawyer, son of Dinarte Mariz
