= Cabral-class ironclad =

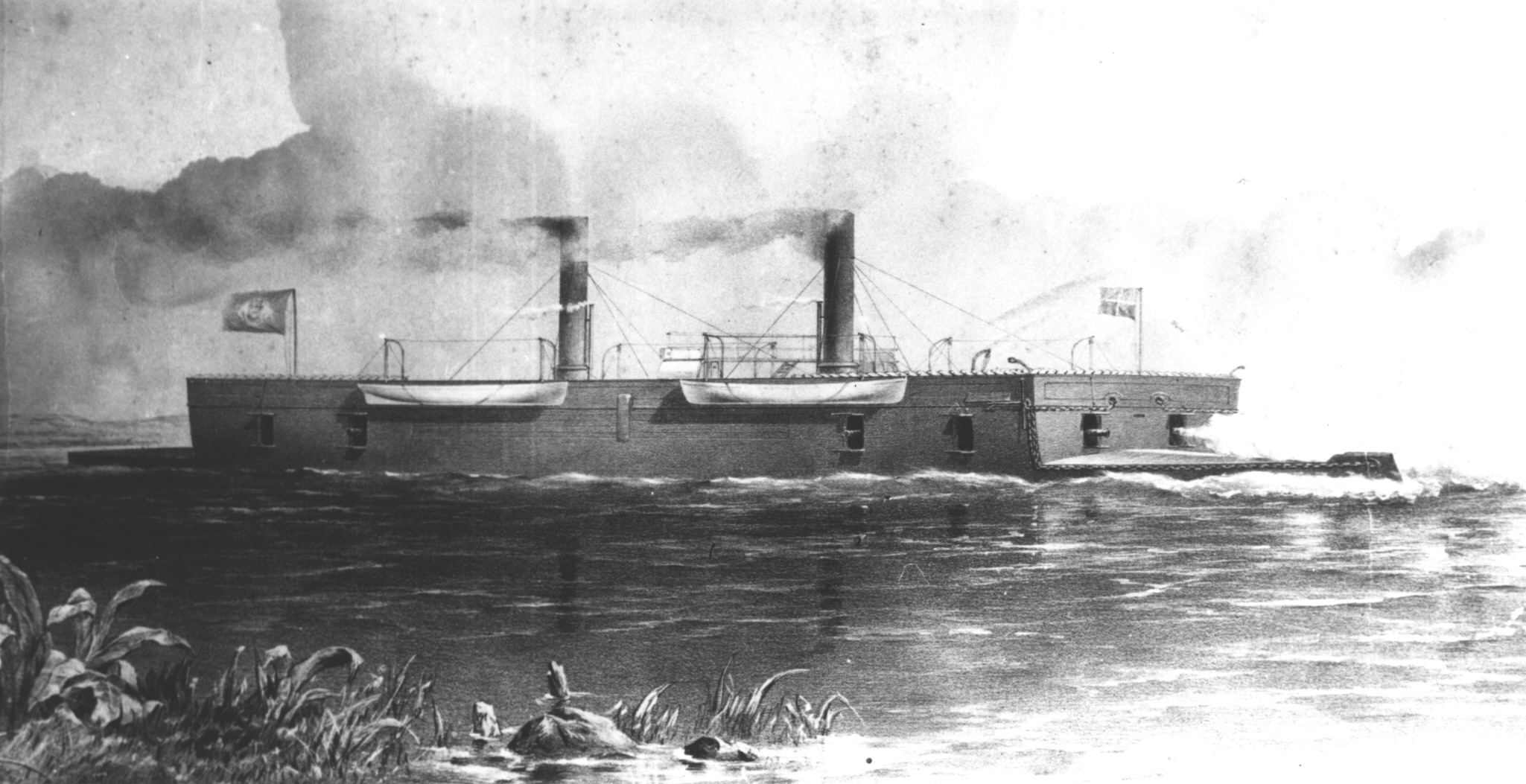
- A drawing of Cabral

Class overview
- Name: Cabral
- Builders: J. and G. Rennie, Millwall, London
- Preceded by: Mariz e Barros class
- Succeeded by: Sete de Setembro
- Built: 1864–1866
- In service: 1866–1885
- Completed: 2
- Scrapped: 2

General characteristics
- Class & type: Armored corvette
- Displacement: 1,033 long tons (1,050 t)
- Length: 160 ft (48.8 m)
- Beam: 35 ft 6 in (10.8 m)
- Draft: 11.75–12.1 ft (3.6–3.7 m)
- Installed power: 750 ihp (560 kW)
- Propulsion: 2 shafts; 2 steam engines
- Speed: 10.5 knots (19.4 km/h; 12.1 mph)
- Armament: 4 × 120-pounder Whitworth rifled muzzle-loading guns or; 2 × 70-pounder Whitworth guns; 2 × 68-pounder smoothbore guns
- Armor: Belt: 3–4.5 in (76–114 mm)

The Cabral-class ironclads were a pair of iron-hulled, armored corvettes originally ordered by Paraguay in 1864, but were sold to Brazil when Paraguay defaulted on the payments. Configured as central-battery ironclads, they served during the 1864–1870 Paraguayan War between Brazil, Argentina and Uruguay against Paraguay.

== Design and description ==
The ships were 160 feet (48.8 m) long, had a beam of 35 feet 6 inches (10.8 m) and drafts of 11.75–12.1 feet (3.6–3.7 m). They displaced 1,033 long tons (1,050 t). The Cabral class had a pair of steam engines, each driving one propeller. The engines produced a total of 750 indicated horsepower (560 kW) and gave the ships a maximum speed of 10.5 knots (19.4 km/h; 12.1 mph). Their crew consisted of 125 officers and enlisted men.

Cabral was armed with two 70-pounder Whitworth rifled muzzle-loading guns and two smoothbore 68-pounder guns, while Colombo had four 120-pounder Whitworth guns. The ships had a complete waterline belt of wrought iron that ranged in thickness from 114 millimeters (4.5 in) amidships to 76 millimeters (3.0 in) at the ends of the ship.

== Ships ==
Paraguayan name	Brazilian name	Namesake	Builder	Laid down	Launched	Completed	Fate
	Cabral	Pedro Álvares Cabral	J. and G. Rennie, Millwall, London			1866	Stricken, 1885
	Colombo	Christopher Columbus	J. and G. Rennie, Millwall, London			1866	Stricken, 1885

== See also ==
- List of ironclads
- List of historical ships of the Brazilian Navy
