= Mariz e Barros-class ironclad =

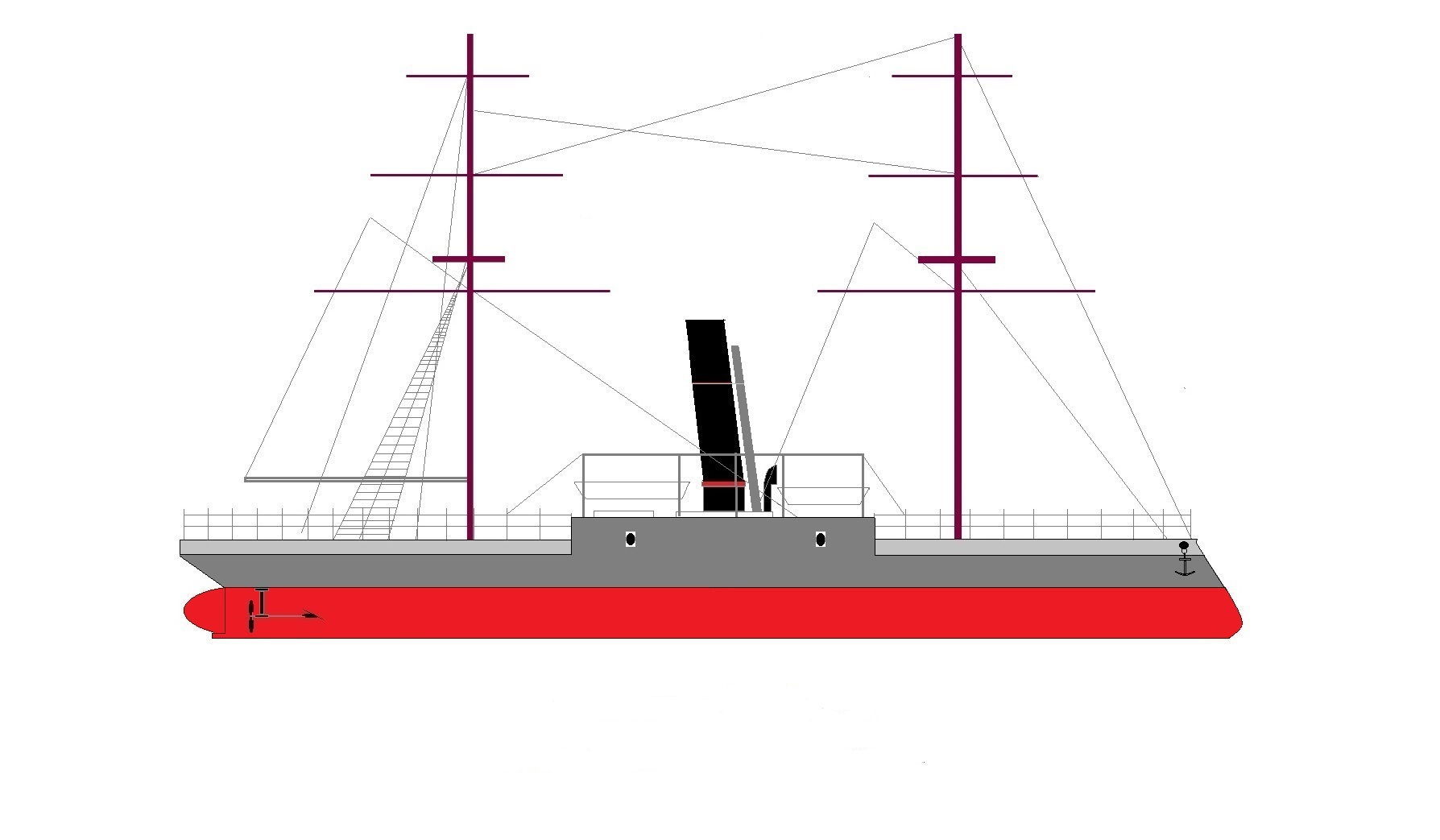

Class overview
- Name: Mariz e Barros
- Builders: J. and G. Rennie, Millwall, London
- Preceded by: Bahia
- Succeeded by: Cabral class
- Built: 1864–1866
- In service: 1866–1897
- Completed: 2
- Scrapped: 2

General characteristics
- Class & type: Armored corvette
- Displacement: 1,196 long tons (1,215 t)
- Length: 191 ft (58.2 m)
- Beam: 36 ft (11.0 m)
- Draft: 8 ft 2 in (2.5 m)
- Installed power: 600 ihp (450 kW)
- Propulsion: 2 shafts; 2 trunk steam engines
- Speed: 9 knots (17 km/h; 10 mph)
- Complement: 125
- Armament: 4 × 120 pdr (7 in (178 mm)) rifled muzzle-loading guns (Herval); 2 × 120 pdr Whitworth guns; 2 × 68 pdr smoothbore muzzle-loading guns (Mariz E. Barros)
- Armor: Belt: 3–4.5 in (76–114 mm); Casemate: 4 in (102 mm)

The Mariz e Barros-class ironclads were a pair of armored corvettes originally ordered by Paraguay in 1864, but were sold to Brazil when Paraguay defaulted on the payments. Configured as central-battery ironclads, they served during the 1864–1870 Paraguayan War between Brazil, Argentina and Uruguay against Paraguay. Herval was scrapped in 1879 while Mariz e Barros was converted into a floating battery in 1884 and scrapped in 1897.

== Design and description ==
The ships were 191 feet (58.2 m) long, had a beam of 36 feet (11.0 m) and drafts of 8.16–9.5 feet (2.5–2.9 m). They displaced 1,196–1,353 long tons (1,215–1,375 t). The Mariz e Barros class had a pair of steam engines, each driving one propeller. The engines produced a total of 600 indicated horsepower (450 kW) and gave the ships a maximum speed of 9 knots (17 km/h; 10 mph). They carried 140 tonnes (138 long tons) of coal although nothing is known about their range or endurance. They were fully rigged with three masts. Their crew consisted of 125 officers and enlisted men.

Mariz e Barros was armed with two 120-pounder Whitworth rifled muzzle-loading guns and two smoothbore 68-pounder guns, while Herval had four 120-pounder guns. The ships had a complete waterline belt of wrought iron that ranged in thickness from 114 millimeters (4.5 in) amidships to 76 millimeters (3 in) at the ends of the ship.

== Ships ==
| Paraguayan name | Brazilian name | Namesake | Builder | Laid down | Launched | Completed | Fate |
|---|---|---|---|---|---|---|---|
| Triton | Mariz e Barros | Lieutenant Antonio Mariz e Barros | J. and G. Rennie, Millwall, London | 1864 | 1865 | 23 July 1866 | Stricken, 1897 |
| Medusa | Herval | General Manuel Luís Osório, the Marquess of Herval | J. and G. Rennie, Millwall, London | 1864 | 1865 | 14 June 1866 | Stricken, 1885 |

== See also ==
- List of ironclads
- List of historical ships of the Brazilian Navy
