= Brazilian ironclad Tamandaré =

Imperial Brazilian Navy's armored gunboat

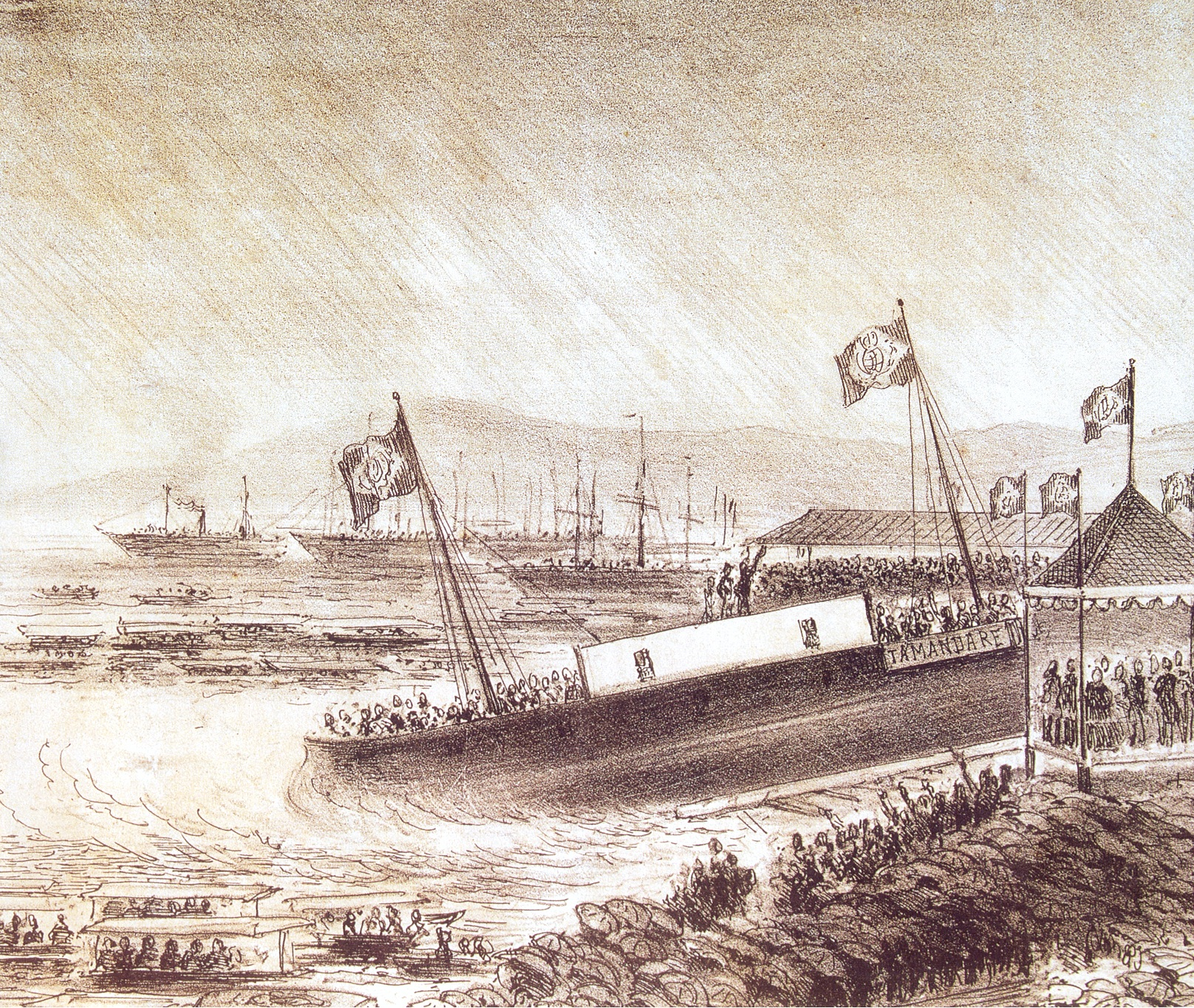
- Launch of Tamandaré in 1865

Class overview
- Operators: Imperial Brazilian Navy
- Preceded by: Barroso
- Succeeded by: Rio de Janeiro
- Built: 1865
- In commission: 1865–1879
- Completed: 1
- Scrapped: 1

History

Empire of Brazil
- Name: Tamandaré
- Namesake: Marquis of Tamandaré
- Builder: Arsenal de Marinha da Corte, Rio de Janeiro
- Cost: £40,506
- Laid down: 31 May 1865
- Launched: 21 June 1865
- Completed: 16 September 1865
- Decommissioned: 18 April 1879
- Fate: Scrapped after decommissioning

General characteristics
- Type: Armored gunboat
- Displacement: 754 metric tons (742 long tons) (normal); 845 metric tons (832 long tons) (deep load)
- Length: 51.36 m (168 ft 6 in)
- Beam: 9.19 m (30 ft 2 in)
- Draft: 2.44 m (8.0 ft) (mean)
- Installed power: 273 ihp (204 kW)
- Propulsion: 1 shaft, 1 steam engine, 2 boilers
- Sail plan: Schooner-rigged
- Speed: 8 knots (15 km/h; 9.2 mph)
- Complement: 120 officers and men
- Armament: 1 × rifled 70-pounder Whitworth gun; 3 × smoothbore 68-pounder guns; 2 × smootbore 12-pounder gun
- Armor: Belt: 51–102 mm (2.0–4.0 in); Casemate: 102 mm (4.0 in); Deck: 12.7 mm (0.50 in)

The Brazilian ironclad Tamandaré was an armored gunboat built for the Imperial Brazilian Navy during the Paraguayan War in the mid-1860s. She bombarded the Paraguayan fortifications blocking access up the Paraná and Paraguay Rivers as well as bombarding Paraguayan positions in support of the Imperial Brazilian Army. The ship participated in the Passage of Humaitá in February 1868 and was badly damaged. After Tamandaré was repaired she provided fire support for the army for the rest of the war, aside from bombarding Paraguayan capital of Asunción once. The ship was assigned to the Mato Grosso Flotilla after the war. Tamandaré was decommissioned in 1879 and scrapped afterwards.

== Design and description ==
Tamandaré was designed to meet the need of the Brazilian Navy for a small, simple, shallow-draft armored ship capable of withstanding heavy fire. She was one of three armored gunboats, together with Barroso and Rio de Janeiro, built to the same general plan, although each ship varied significantly in size and armament. The ship is best characterized as a central battery design because the casemate did not extend the length of the ship. A bronze ram, 1.4 meters (4 ft 7 in) long, was fitted. The hull was sheathed with Muntz metal to reduce biofouling. For sea passages the ship's freeboard could be increased to 1.7 meters (5 ft 7 in) by use of removable bulwarks 1.1 meters (3 ft 7 in) high. On riverine operations, the bulwarks, and the ship's masts, were usually removed.

The ship measured 51.36 meters (168 ft 6 in) long overall, with a beam of 9.19 meters (30 ft 2 in) and had a mean draft of 2.44 meters (8 ft 0 in). Tamandaré normally displaced 754 metric tons (742 long tons) and 845 metric tons (832 long tons) at deep load. Her crew numbered 120 officers and men.

=== Propulsion ===
Tamandaré had a single John Penn & Sons 2-cylinder steam engine taken from the British-built wooden gunboat Tietê and proved unreliable in service. The engine, which drove a single 2-bladed propeller, was powered by two tubular boilers that produced a total of 273 indicated horsepower (204 kW) which gave the ship a maximum speed of 8 knots (15 km/h; 9.2 mph). The ship's funnel was mounted directly in front of her casemate. Tamandaré carried enough coal for six days' steaming.

=== Armament ===
Tamandaré mounted one 70-pounder Whitworth rifled muzzle loader, three 68-pounder and two 12-pounder smoothbore guns in her casemate. To minimize the possibility of shells or splinters entering the casemate through the gunports they were as small as possible, allowing only a 24°-arc of fire for each gun. The rectangular, 9-metre (29 ft 6 in) casemate had two gun ports on each side as well as the front and rear.

The 70-pounder gun weighed 8,582 pounds (3,892.7 kg) and fired a 5.5-inch (140 mm) shell that weighed 81 pounds (36.7 kg). The 7.9-inch (201 mm) solid shot of the 68-pounder gun weighed a nominal 68 pounds (30.8 kg) while the gun itself weighed 10,640 pounds (4,826.2 kg). The gun had a range of 3,200 yards (2,900 m) at an elevation of 12°. The exact type of 12-pounder gun is not known. All of the guns could fire both solid shot and explosive shells.

=== Armor ===
The hull of Tamandaré was made from three layers of wood, each 203 millimeters (8.0 in) thick. The ship had a complete wrought iron waterline belt, 1.52 meters (5.0 ft) high. It had a maximum thickness of 102 millimeters (4 in) covering the machinery and magazines, 51 millimeters (2 in) elsewhere. The curved deck, as well as the roof of the casemate, was armored with 12.7 millimeters (0.5 in) of wrought iron. The casemate was protected by 102 millimeters of armor on all four sides, backed by 609 millimeters (24.0 in) of wood capped with a 102 mm layer of peroba hardwood.

== Service ==
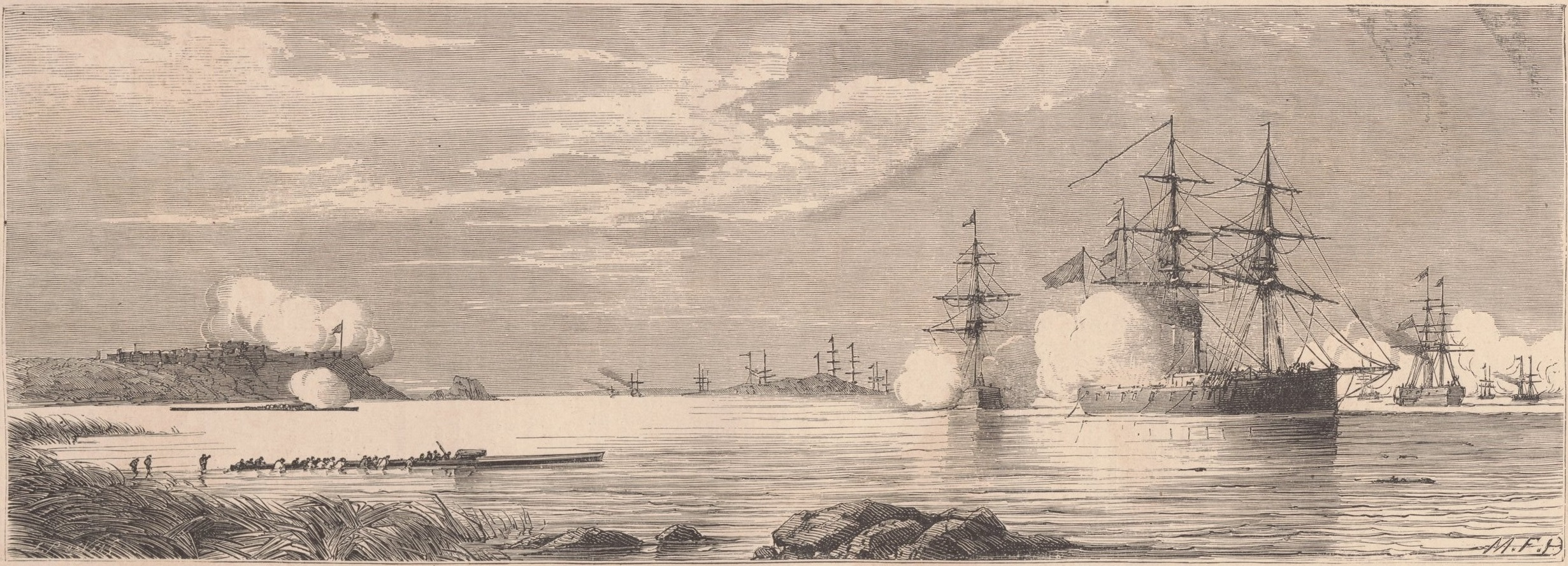
The Brazilian fleet is attacked by a Paraguayan chata, killing 34 people aboard Tamandaré (Le Monde illustré: journal hebdomadaire, nº 477, 1866)

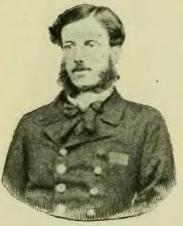
Lieutenant Mariz e Barros, captain of Tamandaré

Tamandaré was laid down at the Arsenal de Marinha da Côrte in Rio de Janeiro on 31 May 1865, during the Paraguayan War, which saw Argentina and Brazil allied against Paraguay. She was launched on 21 June 1865, completed on 16 September and cost £40,506. The ship arrived at Corrientes on 16 March 1866; the next day she sailed for the confluence of the Paraná and Paraguay Rivers to begin operations against the Paraguayans. On 26 March she bombarded the defenses of Itapirú and sank one Paraguayan boat (chata). During her bombardment on the following day, a shell entered one of her gun ports, despite the chain curtain that protected it, and killed 14 men, including her captain, lieutenant Antônio Carlos de Mariz e Barros, and wounded 20. The ship bombarded Curuzú Fort, downstream of Curupaity, on 1 September in company with the ironclads Rio de Janeiro, Brasil, Lima Barros, Barroso, and the monitor Bahia. Between 24 and 29 December Barroso, Tamandaré, Brasil, and 11 gunboats bombarded Curuzu Fort again.

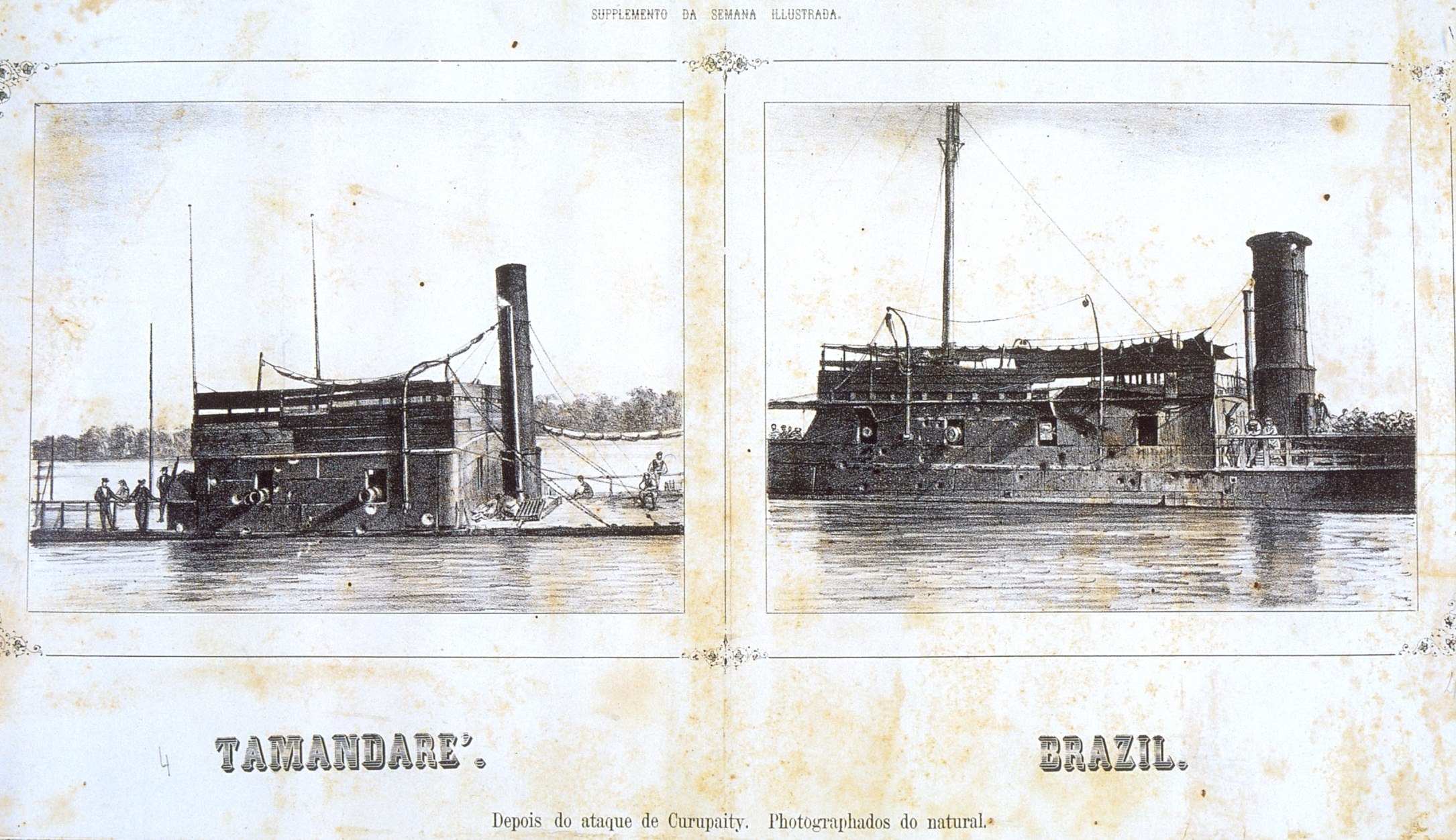
Ironclads Tamandaré (left) and Brasil (right) heavily damaged after the attack on Curuzu Fort, downstream of Curupaity

On 8 January 1867 Tamandaré, Bahia and Colombo bombarded Paraguayan fortifications at Curupaity. The Brazilians broke through the river defenses at Curupaity during daylight on 15 August 1867 with Barroso, Tamanadaré, and eight other ironclads. The ships were hit 256 times, but not seriously damaged, and only suffered 10 killed and 22 wounded. Tamandaré's engines broke down while she was in front of the guns and she had to be towed to safety by the ironclad Silvado. They were quickly repaired and Tamandaré bombarded Paraguayan artillery batteries at Timbó that commanded the Paraguay River north of Humaitá the next day. The Paraguayans repeated the operation again on 9 September with much the same result. On 26 September the Paraguayans moved a large-caliber gun below Humaitá and bombarded the Brazilian squadron, but it was silenced by gunfire from Tamandaré and Bahia.

On 19 February 1868 six Brazilian ironclads, including Tamandaré, steamed past Humaitá at night. Three Pará-class river monitors, Rio Grande, Alagoas and Pará, were lashed to the larger ironclads in case any engines were disabled by the Paraguayan guns. Barroso led with Rio Grande, followed by Bahia with Alagoas and Tamandaré with Pará. Both Tamandaré, which had taken an estimated 120 hits, and Pará had to be beached after passing the fortress to prevent them from sinking. Tamandaré was under repair at São José do Cerrito until mid-March. On 25 November the ship bombarded the Paraguayan capital of Asunción. Tamandaré and Alagoas destroyed the artillery batteries at Timbó on 23 March 1869. The ship was assigned to the Mato Grosso Flotilla, based in Ladário, after the war. Tamandaré was decommissioned on 18 April 1879 and scrapped afterwards.

== See also ==
- Tamandaré-class frigate, a modern Brazilian class of frigates
- List of historical ships of the Brazilian Navy
