= Antônio Carlos de Mariz e Barros =

Brazilian soldier (1835–1866)

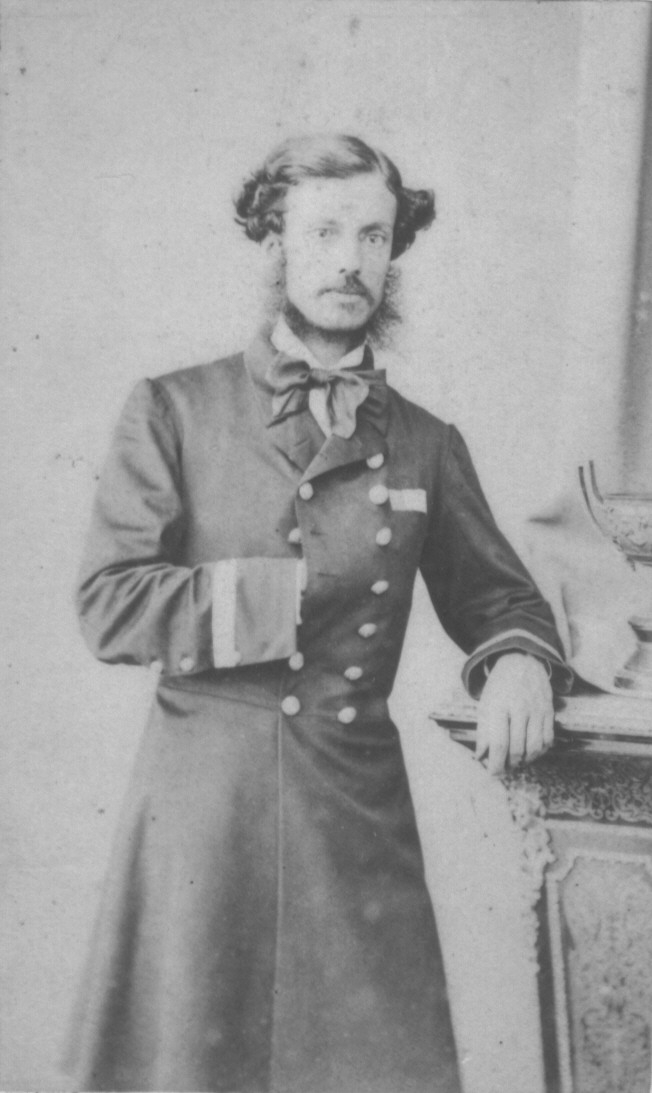
- Mariz e Barros, c. 1866
- Born: 7 March 1835; Rio de Janeiro, Neutral Municipality, Empire of Brazil
- Died: 28 March 1866 (aged 31); Ñeembucú, Paraguay
- Education: Imperial Academy of Midshipmen
- Spouse: Raquel Sofia Teixeira
- Children: 3
- Relatives: Father: Joaquim José Inácio; Mother: Maria José de Mariz Sarmento
- Military career
- Allegiance: Empire of Brazil
- Branch: Imperial Brazilian Navy
- Service years: 1849–1866
- Rank: First lieutenant
- Commands: Ironclad Tamandaré
- Conflicts: Paraguayan War
- Awards: Order of the Rose

Antônio Carlos de Mariz e Barros (7 March 1835 – 28 March 1866) was a Brazilian soldier, combatant in the Uruguayan Campaign and in the Paraguayan War. Mariz e Barros was the son of chief of squad Joaquim José Inácio, the viscount of Inhaúma, and his wife, Maria José de Mariz Sarmento. He studied at the Brazilian Navy Academy, having reached the rank of first lieutenant.

Mariz e Barros temporarily commanded the yacht Paraibano, and effectively the gunboat Campista and the corvettes Belmonte, Recife, and the battleship Tamandaré, gaining prominence on the battlefield during the Uruguay Campaign, where he carried out a successful raid on Paysandú and another against the Sevastopol fort. He was awarded the Order of the Rose after accompanying emperor Pedro II on his journey to the North and the Legion of Honor for saving a French barge that was about to sink on the rocks of the Fort of Laje.

Mariz e Barros died at 1 am on 28 March 1866, during the Paraguayan War. His death occurred as a result of injuries resulting from the explosion caused by one of the cannon projectiles fired by the Fortress of Itapirú that hit Tamandaré's casemate. Before dying, he suffered an amputation during which he would have smoked a cigar. In his honor, the Municipal Chamber of Rio de Janeiro changed the name of Nova do Imperador Street, in the neighborhood of Tijuca, to Mariz e Barros on 16 November 1874. The corvette Mariz e Barros was also named in his honor, in addition to two destroyers.

== Biography ==
=== Early years ===
Mariz e Barros was born on 7 March 1835, at Imperatriz Street, in the city of Rio de Janeiro. He was the son of chief of squad Joaquim José Inácio de Barros and his wife, Maria José de Mariz Sarmento, viscounts of Inhaúma. He initially studied in the schools of Messrs. Alphonse de Morcenq, Antônio Maria Barker, Francisco José Borges and also at the São Pedro de Alcântara School, all in the vicinity of Imperatriz Street, where he was born, in the center of Rio de Janeiro. After that, following his father's example, he joined the Navy Academy and became an aspirant on 14 June 1849. He was promoted to midshipman on 16 November 1852; second lieutenant on 31 March 1855 and first lieutenant on 2 December 1857. During his period as a midshipman, he was sometimes praised for his activity and fearlessness during times of danger. His first command was on the yacht Paraibano, acting as interim captain, and effectively the gunboat Campista and the corvettes Belmonte, Recife, and the battleship Tamandaré.

=== Later years ===
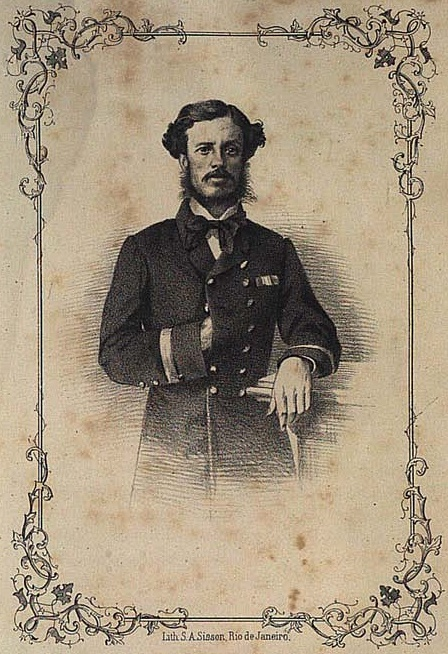
Antônio Carlos de Mariz e Barros in 1866 (S. A. Sisson)

While commanding a naval division and the corvette Belmonte, Mariz e Barros escorted emperor Pedro II on his trip to Northeastern Brazil and was decorated with the habit of the Order of the Rose. He was also awarded the Knight's Cross of the Legion of Honor for saving a French barge that was about to sink on the rocks of the Fortress of Laje.

With the beginning of the Uruguayan Campaign, Mariz e Barros was assigned to the battlefront, gaining notoriety by making a successful raid on the stronghold of Paysandú. During this offensive, he provided defense, under orders from Joaquim Marques Lisboa, to Boa Vista. He also received the support of a detachment of one hundred soldiers from the First Infantry Battalion, commanded by lieutenant Eduardo Emiliano da Fonseca, again mounting a successful offensive against the Sebastopol fort. Mariz e Barros risked his life to save a slave woman who was drowning on Itapuca beach by throwing himself into the sea fully dressed. In 1855, he married Raquel Sofia Teixeira, daughter of Casimiro Manuel Teixeira and Justina Ifigênia, and had three children.

=== Paraguayan War and death ===
On 25 March 1866, part of the imperial squadron in operations in Paraguay was dedicated to attacking the Fortress of Itapirú. During the combat, the Paraguayans managed to bring a barge very close to the steamer Apa. The barge fired as soon as it reached the firing point, scoring many hits on the Brazilian ship. One of the shells caused severe damage to it. At admiral Joaquim Marques Lisboa's orders, the battleship Tamandaré, commanded by Mariz e Barros, and Henrique Dias were sent to aid the steamer Apa, with orders to capture or destroy the Paraguayan barge and, in case it tried to defend the fortress, destroy it too. As soon as they arrived at the place, the two Brazilian ships stopped as close as possible to the beach where the barge was stranded and released their longboats, preparing to board. After that, Tamandaré headed towards the fort that had just begun to concentrate fire on the aforementioned battleship, but which quickly interrupted the salvo.

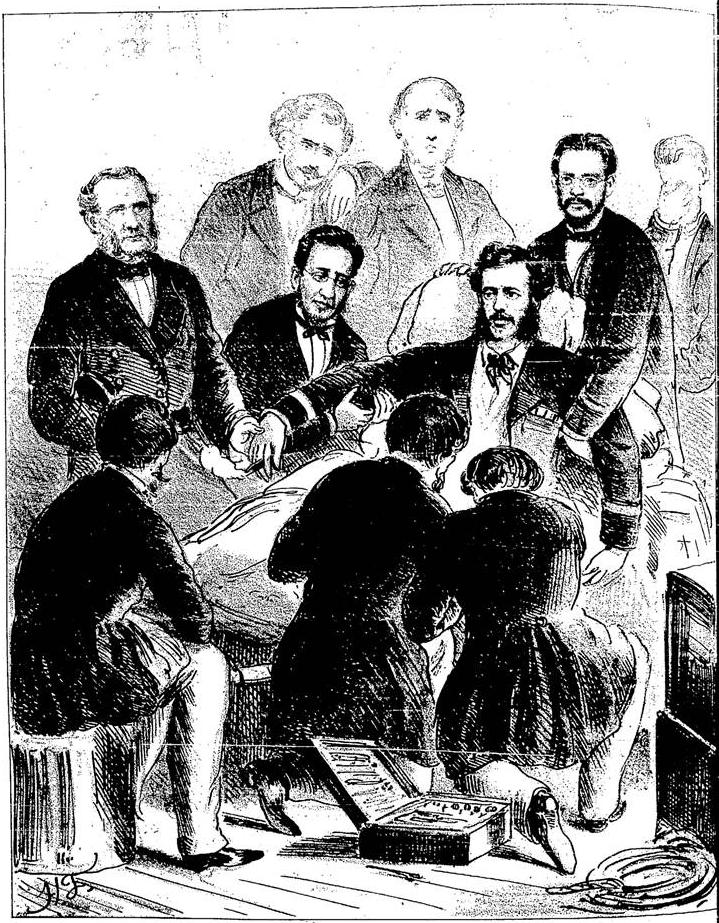
Last moments of first lieutenant Mariz e Barros, commander of the ironclad Tamandaré

After a short period of firing at the fort, the battleship returned close to the Paraguayan barge, ordering the force on land to begin boarding the vessel. However, the Paraguayans were prepared for the offensive, firing heavy fire at the Brazilian longboats. Tamandaré and Henrique Dias responded equally, initiating a terrifying salvo against the Paraguayans. This forced them to climb into pre-dug trenches or simply throw themselves to the ground.

From 10:00 until 16:00, Tamandaré fired alternately at the fort and at the Paraguayans on the beaches, without major damage to the vessel or casualties in the Brazilian crew. However, when the battleship returned to its place in the line of battle, a shot from the fort hit one of the chains that protected one of the portholes, penetrating the casemate and damaging the vessel. 34 men were injured or killed in the explosion resulting from the shot, among which were the ship's chief mate, 1st lieutenant Vassimon, commissioner Acioli, clerk Alboim and ten enlisted men; commander Mariz e Barros, 1st lieutenant Silveira and four sailors; the 2nd lieutenants José Vitor de Lamare and Dionísio Manhães Barreto.

According to reports, Mariz e Barros had "the left leg separated from the thigh at the joint, all the tendons and nerves distended and ruptured, and the bone fragments of the condyles of the femur attached to the tissues". Another report said that, after being hit and verifying that the leg was still "uselessly" attached to the body, he ripped it off with his own hands as if he were just removing his boot. These injuries led to an amputation of his leg during which he smoked a cigar without showing any signs of pain or moaning, after refusing chloroform. At midnight of that day, convinced that he would die, he sent a message to his father through the doctor who was treating him that he "always knew how to honor his name". Mariz e Barros died at 1 am on 28 March at the age of 31, with Dionísio Manhães Barreto assuming command of the vessel.

== Homages ==
In the session of 16 November 1874, the Municipal Chamber of Rio de Janeiro changed the name of Nova do Imperador Street, in the neighborhood of Tijuca, to Mariz e Barros Street. The corvette Mariz e Barros was also named in his honor, in addition to two destroyers.
