= São José do Cerrito =

Coordinates: 27°40′S 50°35′W

- Municipality
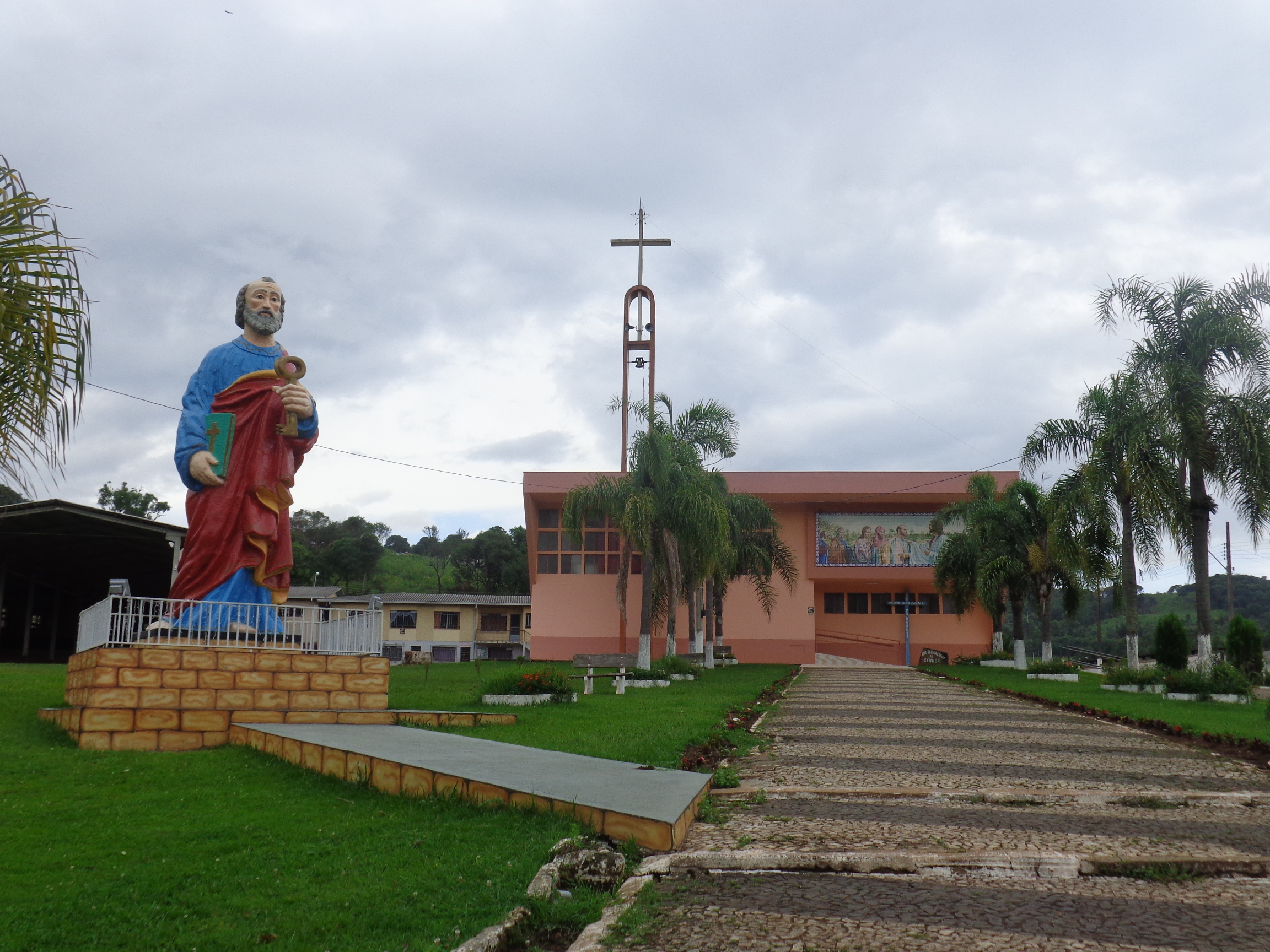

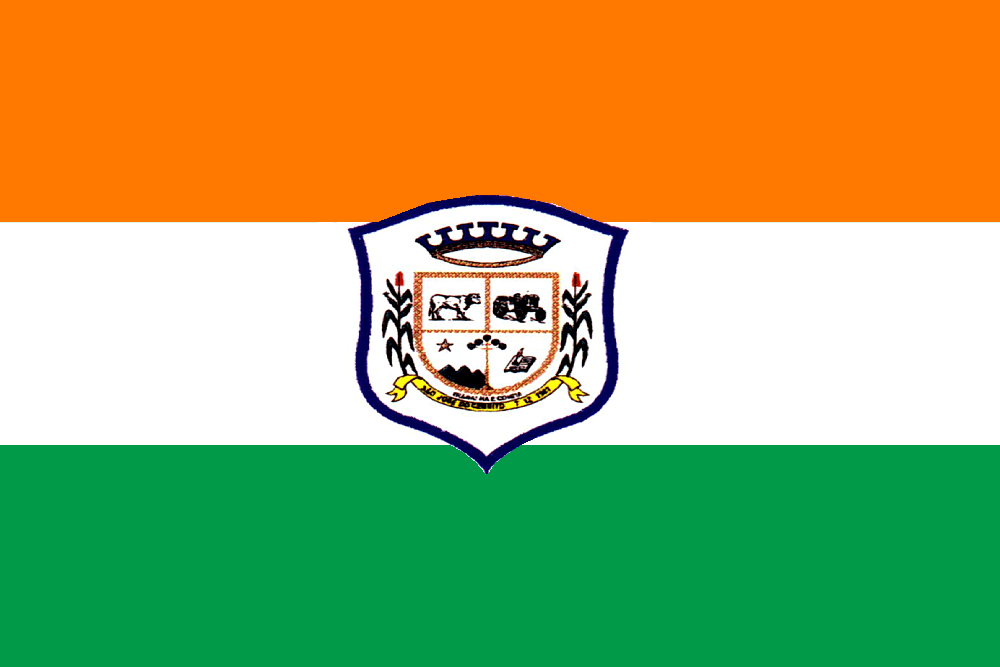
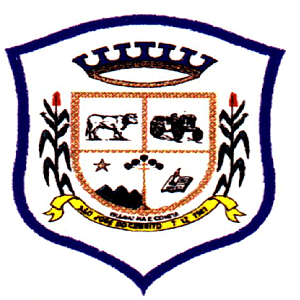
- Flag Coat of arms
- Interactive map of São José do Cerrito
- Country: Brazil
- Region: South
- State: Santa Catarina
- Mesoregion: Serrana

Population (2020)
  - Total: 8,173
- Time zone: UTC -3

São José do Cerrito is a municipality in the state of Santa Catarina in the South region of Brazil. It was created in 1961 out of the existing municipality of Lages.

== See also ==
- List of municipalities in Santa Catarina
