= Battle of Curupayty =

Battle of the Paraguayan War

Coordinates: 27°6′47″S 58°34′28″W

- Part of the Humaitá campaign
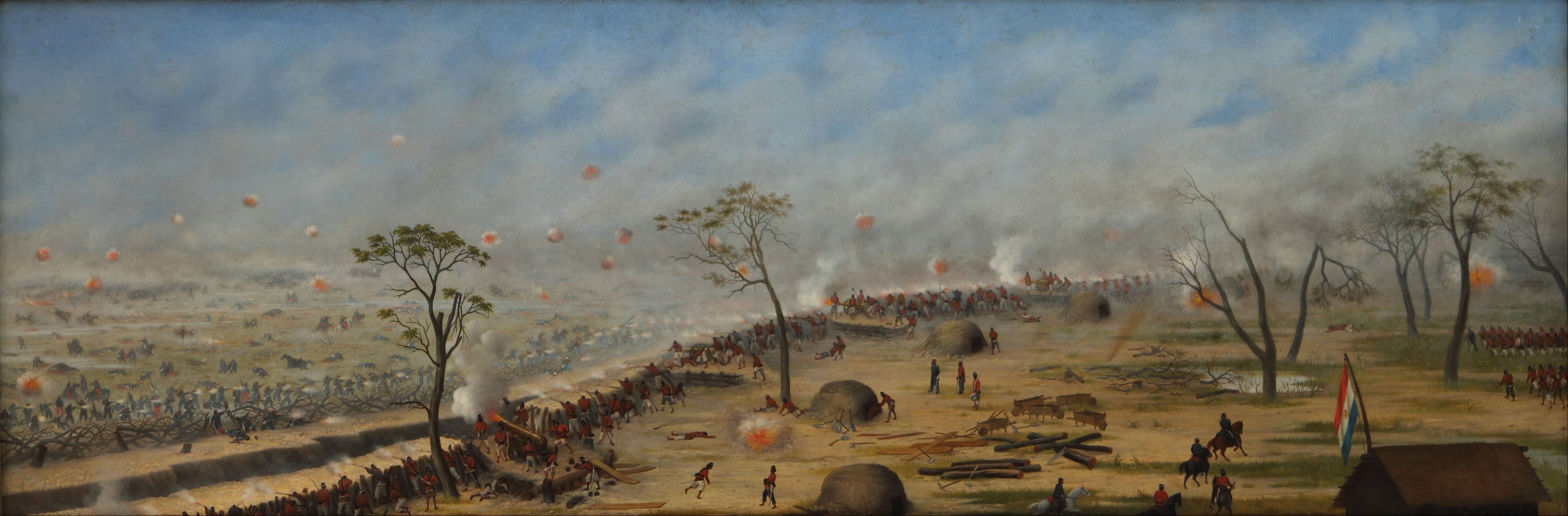
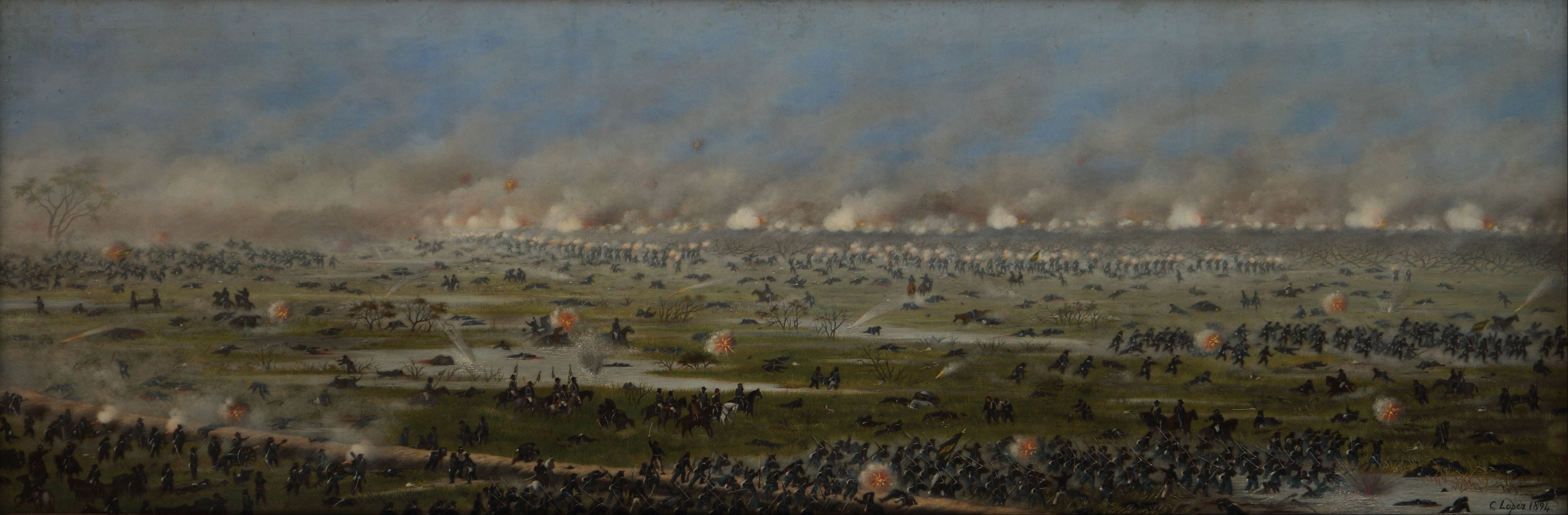
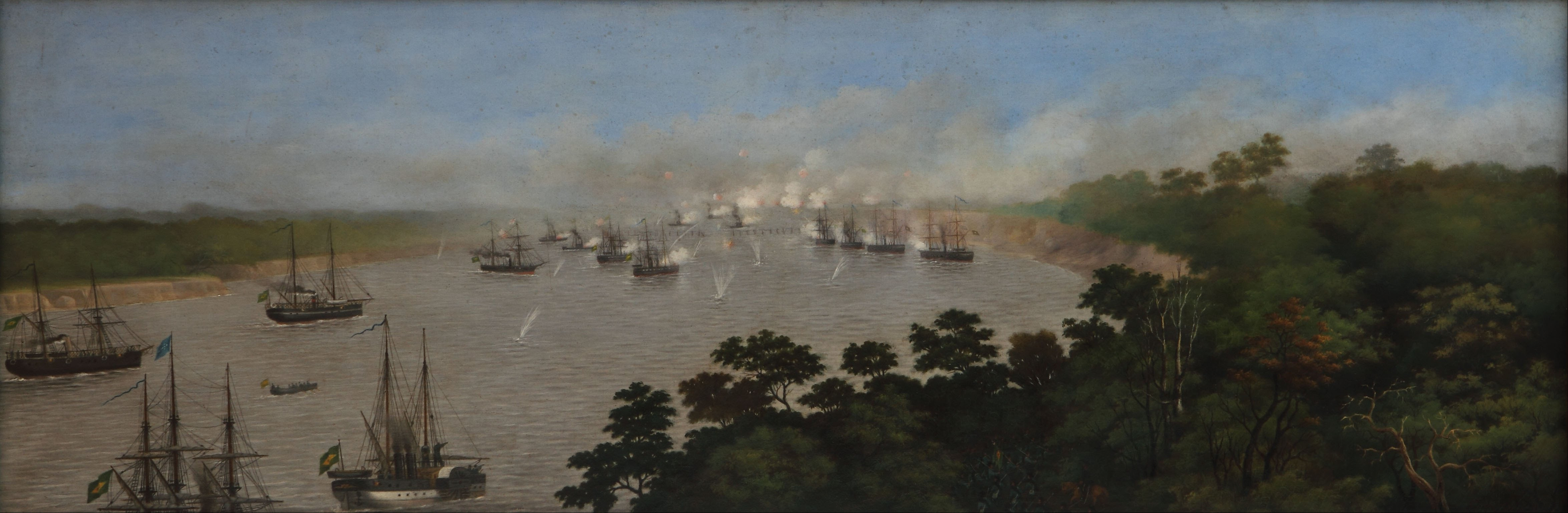
- Top: Paraguayan artillery firing at allied forces Middle: Assault of the second Brazilian column Bottom: Brazilian navy bombardment
Date	22 September 1866
Location	Curupayty, Paraguay
Result	Paraguayan victory

Belligerents
Paraguay	Empire of Brazil; Argentina; Uruguay

Commanders and leaders
José E. Díaz	Bartolomé Mitre; Joaquim M. Lisboa; Marques de Sousa; Venancio Flores

Strength
5,000; 49 cannons	11,000 Brazilians; 9,000 Argentines; 8 ironclads and 3 gunboats

Casualties and losses
92: 54 killed 38 wounded	4,227: 2,225 Argentine casualties 2,002 Brazilian casualties

The Battle of Curupayty was a key battle in the Paraguayan War. On the morning on 22 September 1866, the joint force of Brazilian, Argentine, and Uruguayan armies attacked Paraguayan fortified trenches on Curupayty. The Paraguayans were led by general José Eduvigis Díaz. This position was held by 5,000 men and 49 cannons, some of them in hidden places out of the attackers view. The Imperial Brazilian Navy gave support to the 20,000 assailants, but the ships had to keep some distance from the guns at the fortress of Humaitá, which led to the lack of accuracy and impact of the ship's fire. The navy's failure was crucial at the later ground battle result.

The Paraguayans were also successful in misleading their foes: a trench drew most of the Brazilian fire, but the Paraguayan troops were located elsewhere. Paraguay easily repelled the assault, and the battle lasted less than a day. Around 20 percent of the almost 20,000 allied (Brazilian and Argentine) troops involved in the attack were lost; Paraguay lost less than a hundred men. The utter failure resulted in the change of the Allied command. Paraguay's biggest success in the ultimately disastrous war was limited because its military leader, Francisco Solano López, did not counterattack the defeated Allies. This failure for the coalition has been called their "greatest defeat of the war".

== Naval bombardment ==
The 22 September attack started with a bombardment by Admiral Tamandaré's fleet at 07:00 which lasted until noon, but with little effect. Participating in the attack were the ships Brasil, Barroso, Tamandaré, Ipiranga, Belmonte, Parnaíba, Pedro Affonso, Forte de Coimbra, and the gunboats No. 1, 2, and 3. Despite the firing of 5,000 bombs and shells, only one Paraguayan gun was damaged.

== Allied land attack ==
Bartolomé Mitre saw that the Imperial fleet had finished its cannonade and, assuming that the Paraguayan positions were destroyed, ordered the advance on land. The right wing was composed of two columns of Argentines, under the command of Generals Emilio Mitre and Wenceslao Paunero. The left wing was composed of two columns of Brazilians under the command of General Albino de Carvalho and Colonel Augusto Caldas. The center was also composed of Brazilians, commanded by Colonel Lucas de Lima.

General Polidoro Jordão was to attack the Paraguayan defenses at Paso Gomez, along the Estero Rojas, with 20,000 Brazilians. General Venancio Flores was to take a cavalry force in a flanking movement against the Paraguayan's on the Allied right. Once the Allied soldiers had crossed two ditches, and were reaching the top of the wall, they were within reach of the Paraguayan artillery; Díaz ordered the artillery to fire with grape, canister, and shell shot. This inflicted heavy casualties amongst the Allied troops who were slowly advancing in dense formations through the muddy terrain. Allied soldiers could not get close to the wall of the Paraguayan fort, with only about 60 making it, who were soon killed. By 14:00, the attack was abandoned, and by 17:00, the Allied army was back in Curuzú.

== Aftermath ==
Immediate Aftermath

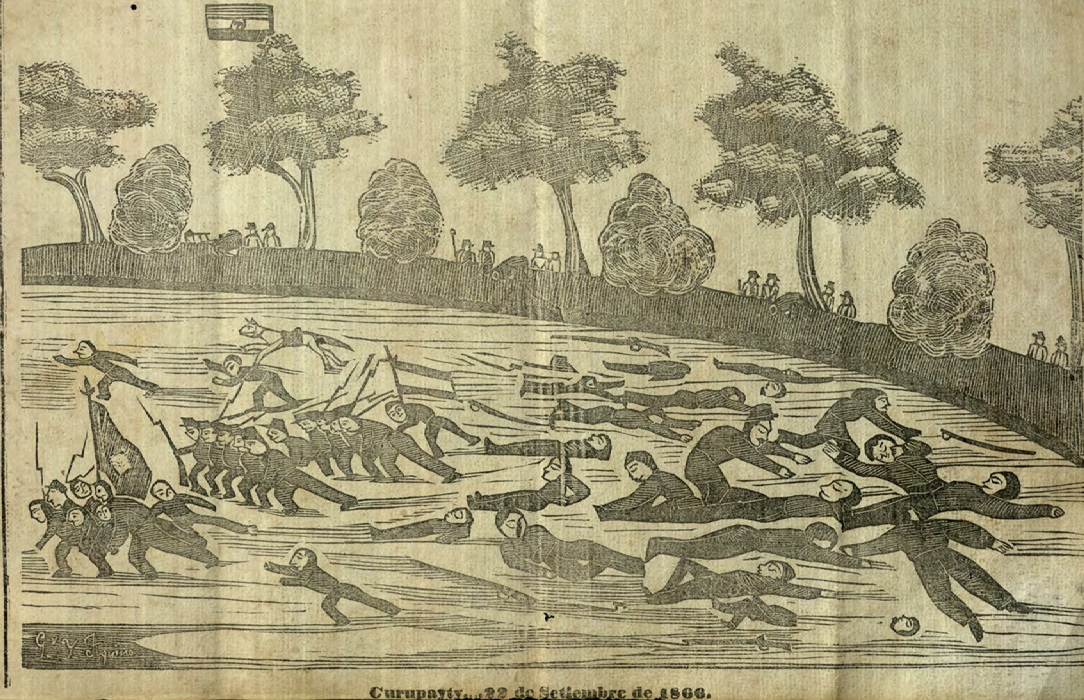
Battle of Curupayty (El Cabichuí, nº 40, 23 September 1866).

In the immediate aftermath of the battle, the Triple Alliance forces retreated to their previous positions, suffering heavy losses. The Allied offensive was halted for ten months, until July 1867. The Paraguayan victory bolstered morale and provided them with captured weapons, ammunition, and supplies. It was limited by the failure of the Paraguayan forces to counterattack the defeated allies; the allied retreat had been organized, however, and covered by the naval artillery of Admiral Tamandaré's squadron.

Military Strategies and Outcomes

Following the Battle of Curupayty, both sides reevaluated their military strategies. The Triple Alliance forces, recognizing their underestimation of Paraguay's defensive capabilities, adopted a more cautious approach to future engagements. Meanwhile, Paraguay continued to build upon its defensive strategy, constructing additional fortifications and strengthening its position along the Paraguay River.

Despite their victory at Curupayty, the Paraguayan forces were ultimately unable to repel the offensive of the Triple Alliance. In 1868, after the Siege of Humaitá and the fall of Asunción, Paraguay's situation became increasingly desperate. Nevertheless, President López refused to surrender, prolonging the conflict and causing further devastation to his country.

Political Developments

The Paraguayan victory at Curupayty had a significant impact on the political landscape of the war. The unexpected defeat led to tensions among the members of the Triple Alliance and calls for the replacement of the Brazilian commander, Marshal Osório. Open revolt against the war started in Argentina by January 1867, forcing President Mitre to send "The Army of Pacification" of 4,000 under Paunero's command. Disturbances in Uruguay forced the recall of general Flores, who was subsequently assassinated.

In Paraguay, the victory at Curupayty became a powerful symbol of national unity and resistance. The press, previously under tight censorship, began to echo the enthusiasm of the central elites. New newspapers such as El Centinela published patriotic slogans praising Marshal López and the Paraguayan cause, and even political opponents were pardoned in an atmosphere of national exaltation. At the same time, the prolonged stalemate following Curupayty deepened political divisions within the allied countries. In Brazil, liberal opposition to the war grew increasingly vocal, leading Marshal Caxias to present his resignation, while in Argentina and Uruguay, the prolonged conflict eroded support for the central elites’ war project.

In general, the battle raised doubts about the feasibility of a swift victory, contributing to the war's prolongation and exacerbating the humanitarian crisis in the region.

Legacy

The Battle of Curupayty and its aftermath are remembered as a turning point in the Paraguayan War. While the battle demonstrated Paraguay's military prowess and determination, it also contributed to the conflict's protraction and the country's ultimate devastation. Today, the Battle of Curupayty is commemorated as a symbol of Paraguayan resistance and national pride, while also serving as a reminder of the high cost of war.

== Gallery: Timeline of the battle of Curupayty by Cándido Lopez ==
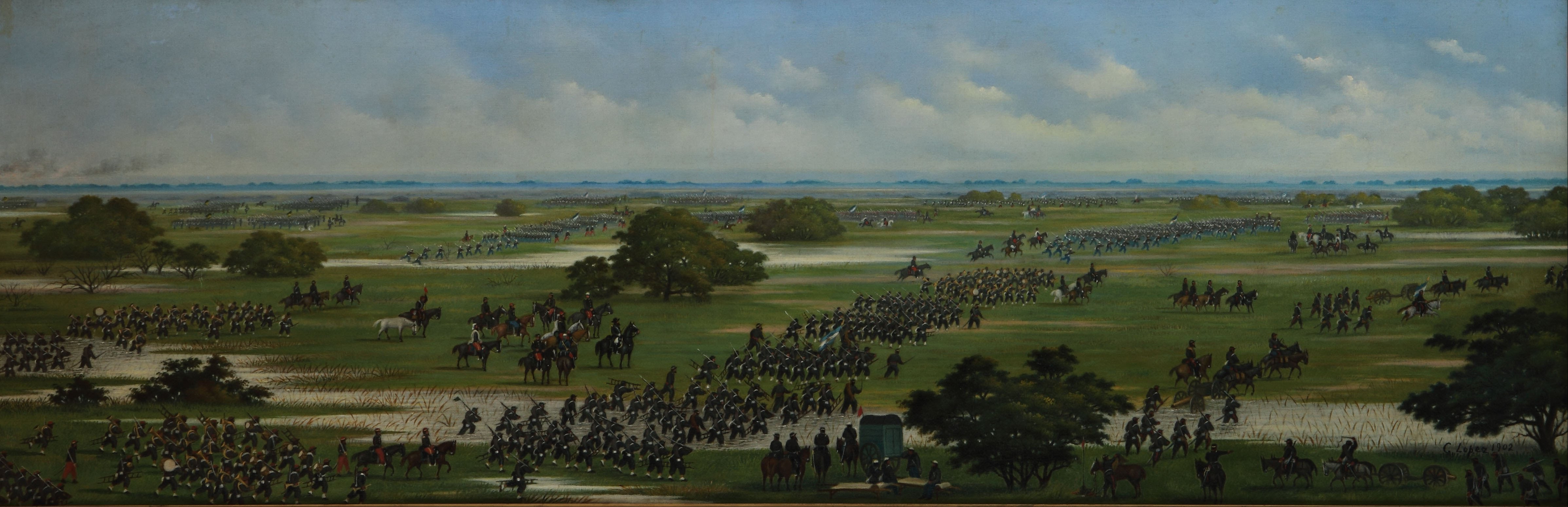
March of the Argentine Army to take positions for the attack on Curupaytí.

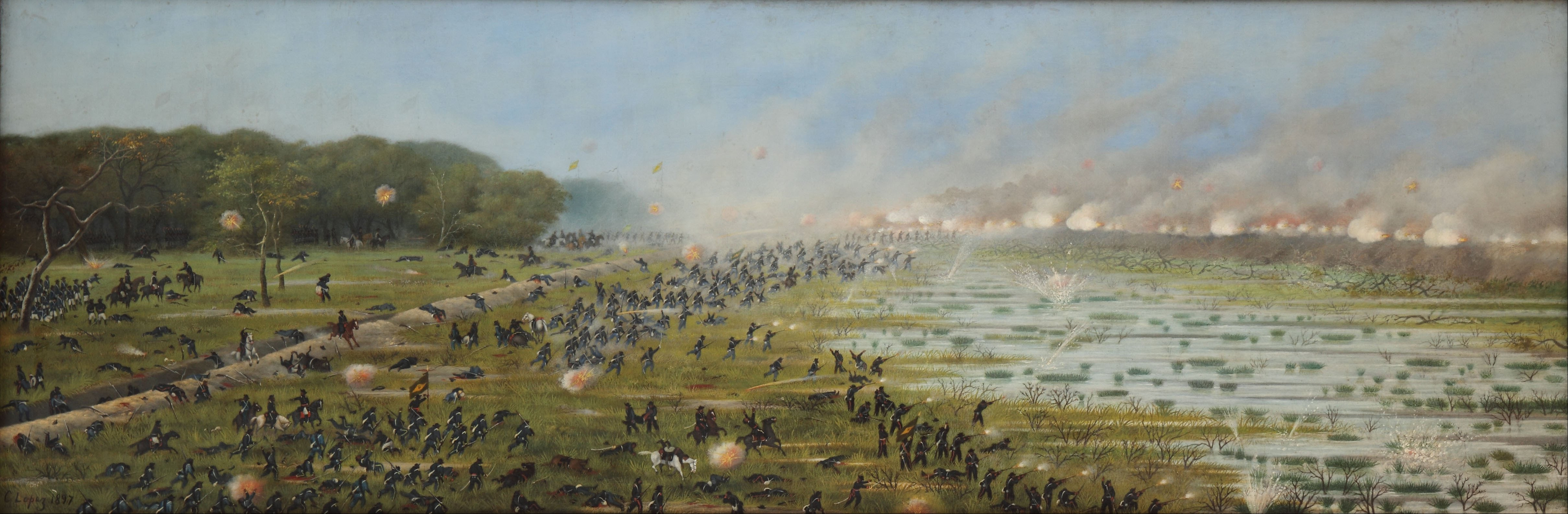
First attack by the Brazilian Army against Curupaytí.

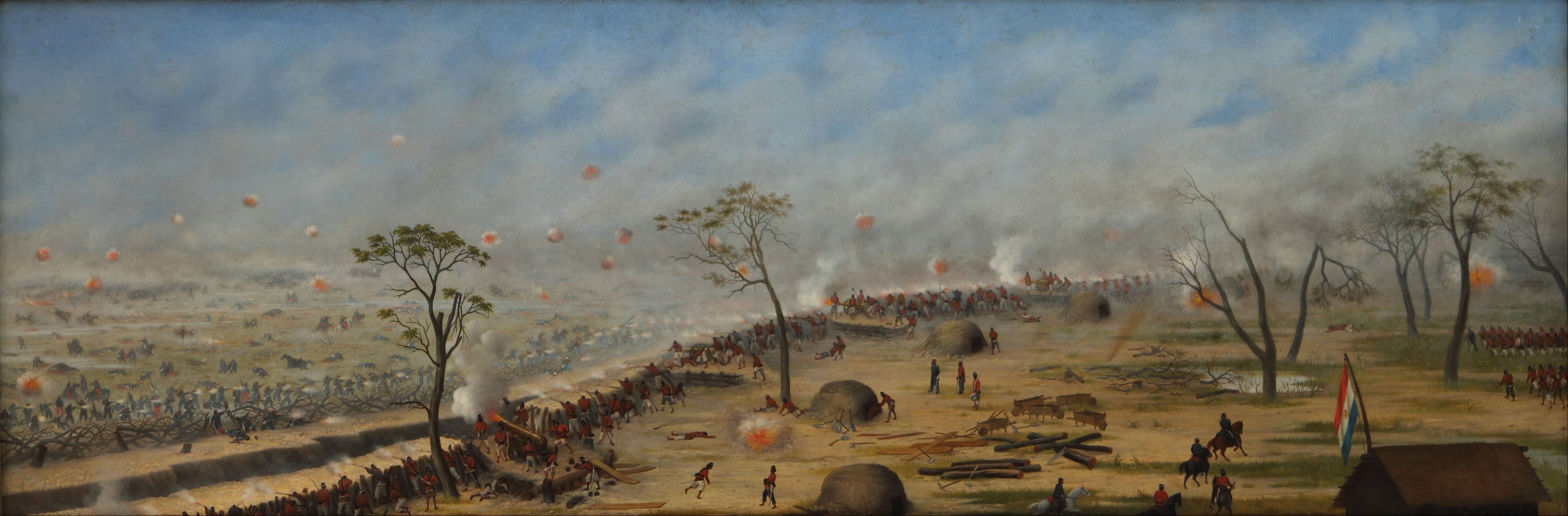
Paraguayan fortification of Curupaytí.

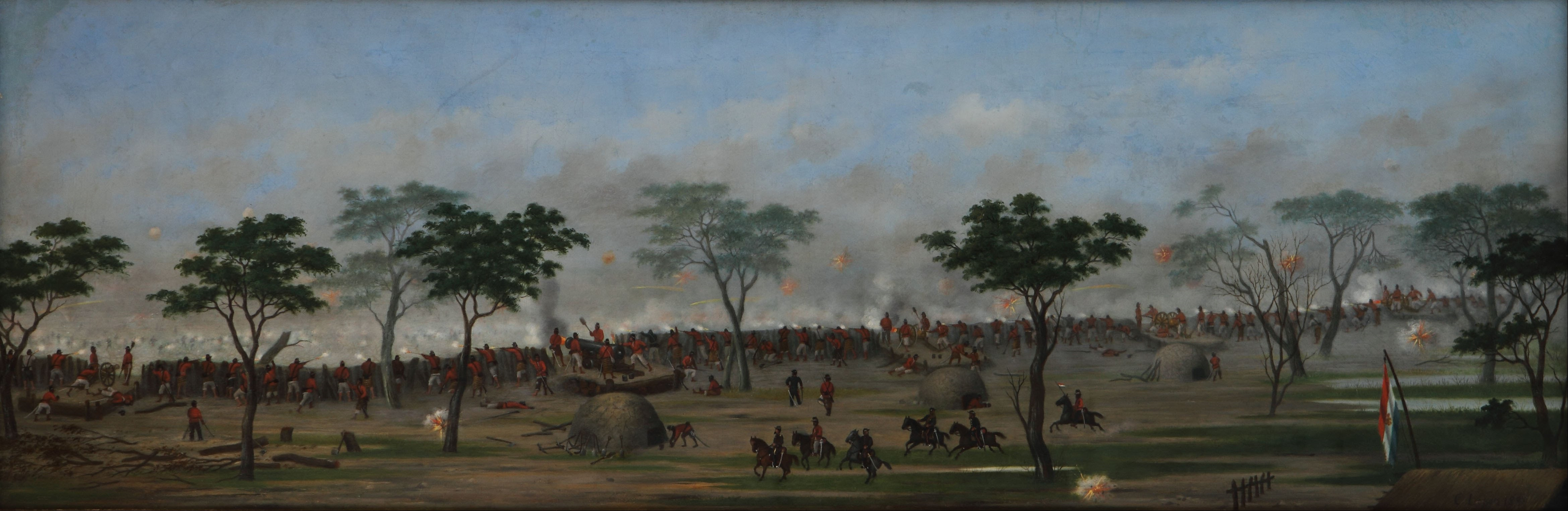
Paraguayan Army resists the Allied offensive in the trenches.

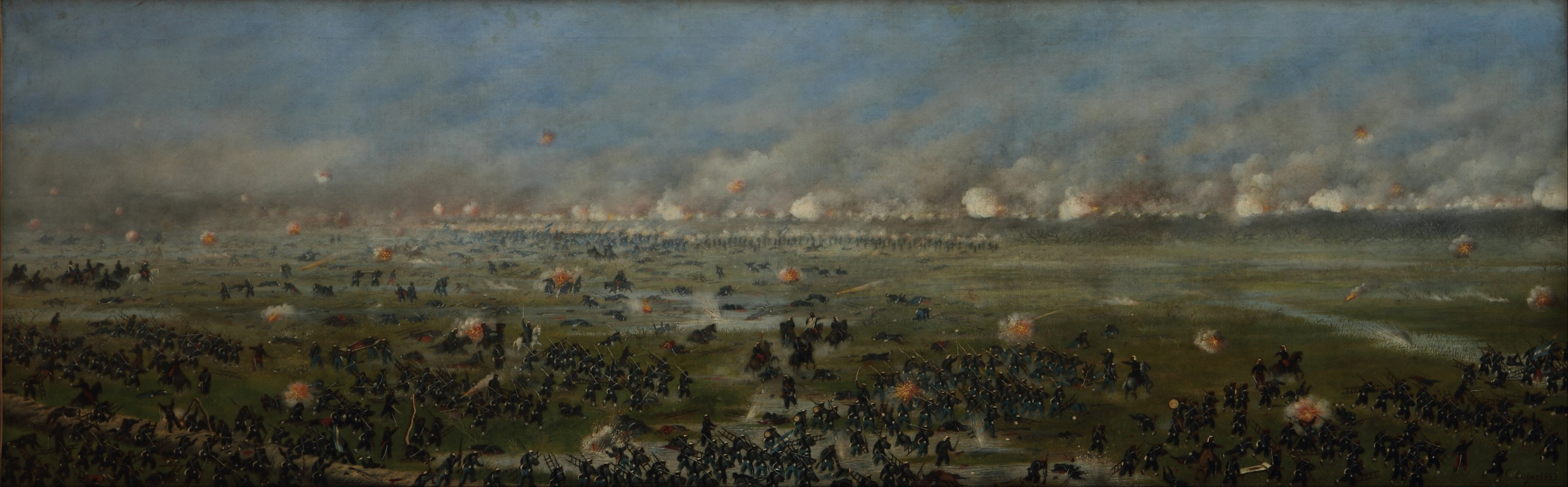
First attack by the Argentine Army on Curupaytí.

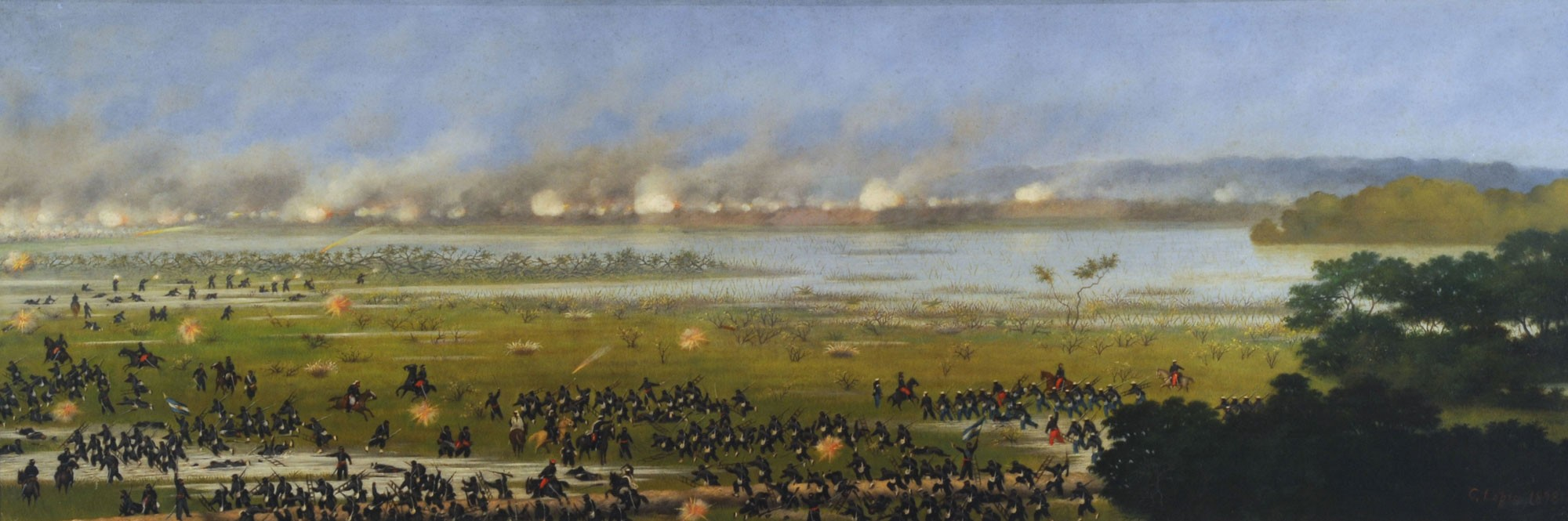
Argentine Army moves for second attack.

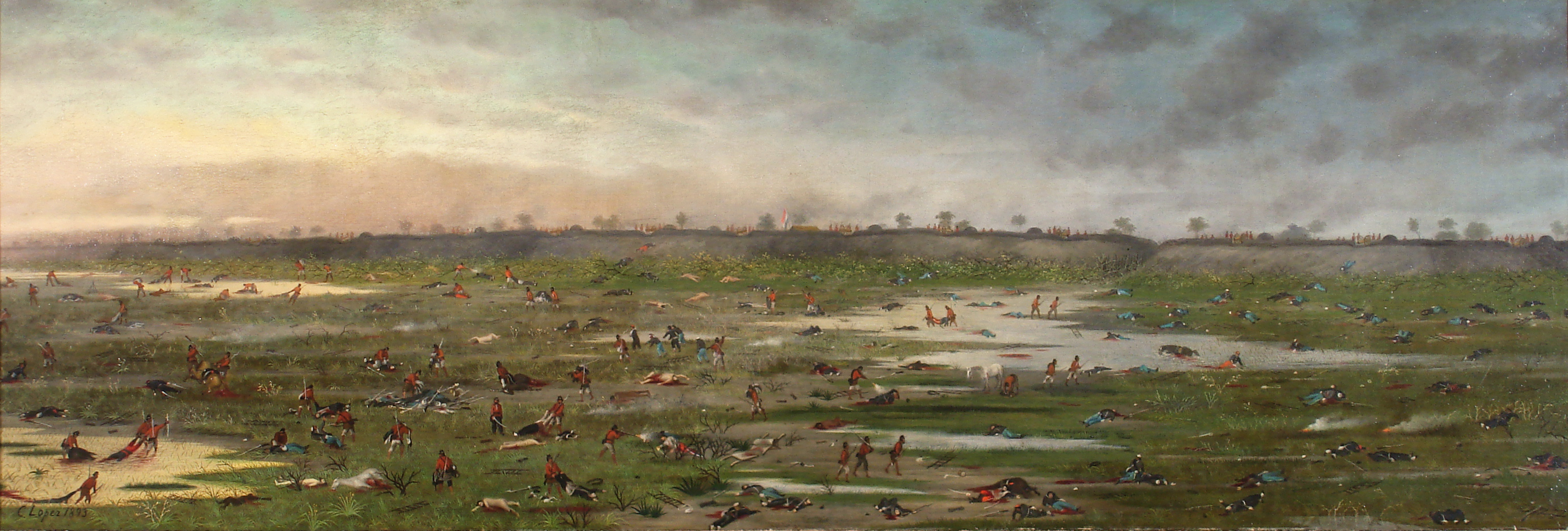
Tragedy of the Allied Armies in Curupaytí.
