= Brazilian ironclad Barroso =

Imperial Brazilian Navy's armoured gunboat

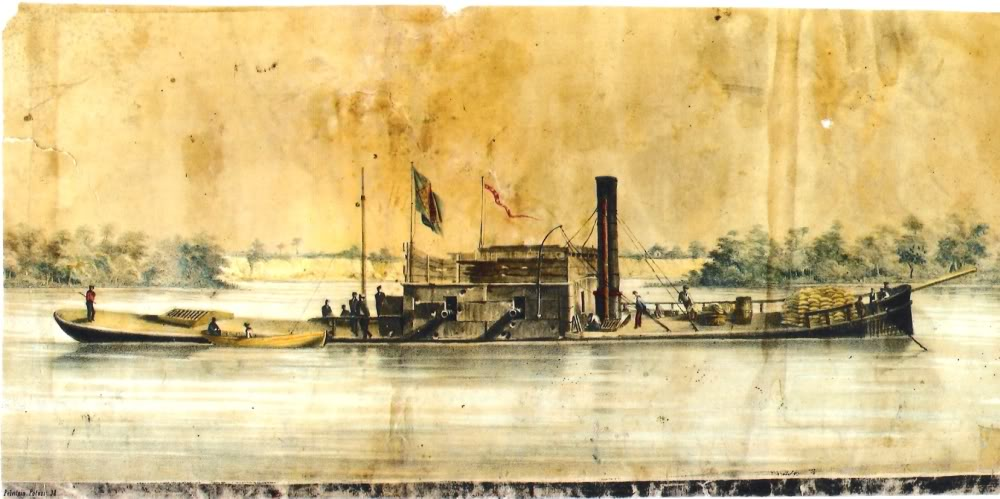

Class overview
- Operators: Imperial Brazilian Navy
- Preceded by: Brasil
- Succeeded by: Tamandaré
- Built: 1863–1864
- In service: 1864–1882
- In commission: 1864–1882
- Completed: 1
- Scrapped: 1

History

Empire of Brazil
- Name: Barroso
- Namesake: Admiral Francisco Manoel Barroso da Silva
- Builder: Arsenal de Marinha da Côrte, Rio de Janeiro
- Cost: £55,046
- Laid down: 21 February 1865
- Launched: 4 November 1865
- Completed: 11 January 1866
- Decommissioned: 1882
- Fate: Scrapped 1937

General characteristics
- Type: Armored gunboat
- Displacement: 980 metric tons (960 long tons) (normal); 1,354 metric tons (1,333 long tons) (deep load)
- Length: 61.44 m (201 ft 7 in)
- Beam: 10.97 m (36 ft 0 in)
- Draft: 2.74 m (9.0 ft) (mean)
- Installed power: 420 ihp (310 kW)
- Propulsion: 1 shaft, 1 steam engine, 2 boilers
- Sail plan: Schooner-rigged
- Speed: 9 knots (17 km/h; 10 mph)
- Complement: 149 officers and men
- Armament: 1 × rifled 120-pounder Whitworth gun; 2 × rifled 70-pounder Whitworth guns; 2 × smoothbore 68-pounder guns; 2 × smoothbore 12-pounder guns
- Armor: Belt: 51–102 mm (2.0–4.0 in); Casemate: 102 mm (4.0 in); Deck: 12.7 mm (0.50 in)

The Brazilian ironclad Barroso was an armoured gunboat built for the Brazilian Navy during the Paraguayan War in the mid-1860s. Barroso bombarded Paraguayan fortifications in 1866 and 1867 a number of times before she participated in the Passagem de Humaitá in February 1868. Afterwards the ship provided fire support for the army for the rest of the war. She was assigned to the Mato Grosso Flotilla after the war. Barroso was decommissioned in 1882, but was not scrapped until 1937.

== Design and description ==
Barroso was designed to meet the need of the Brazilian Navy for a small, simple, shallow-draft armored ship capable of withstanding heavy fire. The ship is best characterized as a central battery design because the casemate did not extend the length of the ship. A bronze ram, 1.8 meters (5 ft 11 in) long, was fitted. The hull was sheathed with Muntz metal to reduce biofouling. For sea passages the ship's free board could be increased to 1.7 meters (5 ft 7 in) by use of removable bulwarks 1.1 meters (3 ft 7 in) high. On riverine operations, the bulwarks and the ship's masts were usually removed.

The ship measured 61.44 meters (201 ft 7 in) long overall, with a beam of 10.97 meters (36 ft 0 in) and had a mean draft of 2.74 meters (9 ft 0 in). Barosso normally displaced 980 metric tons (960 long tons) and 1,354 metric tons (1,333 long tons) at deep load. Her crew numbered 149 officers and men.

=== Propulsion ===
Barroso had a single John Penn & Sons 2-cylinder steam engine driving a single 2-bladed propeller. Her engine was powered by two tubular boilers. The engine produced a total of 420 indicated horsepower (310 kW) which gave the ship a maximum speed of 9 knots (17 km/h; 10 mph). The ship's funnel was mounted directly in front of her casemate. Barroso carried enough coal for six days' steaming.

=== Armament ===
Barroso mounted one 120-pounder Whitworth and two 70-pounder Whitworth rifled muzzle loaders, two 68-pounder and two 12-pounder smoothbore guns in her casemate. To minimize the possibility of shells or splinters entering the casemate through the gun ports they were as small as possible, allowing only a 24°-arc of fire for each gun. The rectangular, 9.8-meter (32 ft 2 in) casemate had two gun ports on each side as well as the front and rear.

The 7-inch (178 mm) shell of the 120-pounder gun weighed 151 pounds (68.5 kg) while the gun itself weighed 16,660 pounds (7,556.8 kg). The 70-pounder gun weighed 8,582 pounds (3,892.7 kg) and fired a 5.5-inch (140 mm) shell that weighed 81 pounds (36.7 kg). The 7.9-inch (201 mm) solid shot of the 68-pounder gun weighed approximately 68 pounds (30.8 kg) while the gun itself weighed 10,640 pounds (4,826.2 kg). The gun had a range of 3,200 yards (2,900 m) at an elevation of 12°. The exact type of 12-pounder gun is not known. All of the guns could fire both solid shot and explosive shells.

=== Armor ===
The hull of Barroso was made from three layers of wood, each 203 millimeters (8.0 in) thick. The ship had a complete wrought iron waterline belt, 1.52 meters (5.0 ft) high. It had a maximum thickness of 102 millimeters (4 in) covering the machinery and magazines, 51 millimeters (2 in) elsewhere. The curved deck, as well as the roof of the casemate, was armoured with 12.7 millimeters (0.5 in) of wrought iron. The casemate was protected by 102 millimetres of armour on all four sides, backed by 609 millimeters (24.0 in) of wood capped with a 102 mm layer of peroba hardwood.

== Service ==
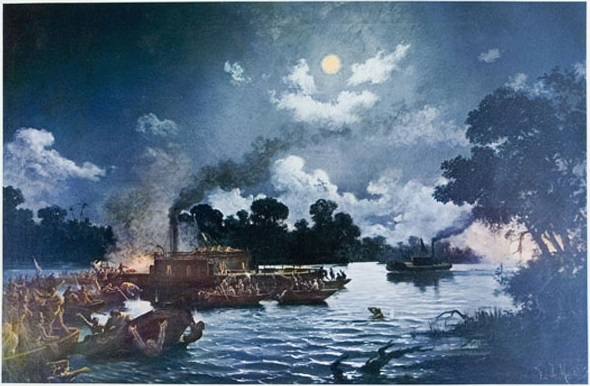
Paraguayans trying to board the ironclad Barroso and the monitor Rio Grande during the War of the Triple Alliance.

Barroso was laid down at the Arsenal de Marinha da Côrte in Rio de Janeiro on 21 February 1865. She was launched on 4 November 1865 and completed on 11 January 1866. On 26–28 March 1866 she bombarded the Paraguayan fortifications at Curupaity where she was hit 20 times, but not significantly damaged. The ship bombarded Curuzu Fort, downstream of Curupaity, on 1 September in company with the ironclads Rio de Janeiro, Brasil, Lima Barros, Tamandaré, and the monitor Bahia. The ships bombarded Curupaity again on 4 September and Barroso was hit four more times. On 22 September the Allied army attempted to storm the fortifications at Curupaity, supported by fire from the Brazilian ironclads, but was rebuffed with heavy losses. Between 24 and 29 December Barroso, Tamandaré, Brasil, and 11 gunboats bombarded Curuzu Fort again.

The Brazilians broke through the river defences at Curupaity during daylight on 15 August 1867 with Barroso, Tamanadaré, and eight other ironclads. The ships were hit 256 times, but not seriously damaged, and only suffered 10 killed and 22 wounded. They repeated the operation again on 9 September. On 19 February 1868 six Brazilian ironclads, including Barroso, steamed past Humaitá at night. Three Pará-class river monitors, Rio Grande, Alagoas and Pará were lashed to the larger ironclads in case any engines were disabled by the Paraguayan guns. Barroso led with Rio Grande, followed by Bahia with Alagoas and Tamandaré with Pará. Barroso continued upstream with the other undamaged ships and they bombarded Asunción on 24 February. On 23 March Rio Grande and Barroso sank the steamer Igurey and both ships were boarded by Paraguayan soldiers on the evening of 9 July, although they managed to repel the boarders.

After the war the ship served with the Mato Grosso Flotilla and was decommissioned in 1882. However, Barroso was not scrapped until 1937.

== See also ==
- List of historical ships of the Brazilian Navy
