= Brazilian ship Mariz e Barros =

Several ships of the Brazilian Navy have been named Mariz e Barros:

- Brazilian ironclad Mariz e Barros, launched in 1866 and stricken in 1897
- Mariz e Barros, a Marcílio Dias-class destroyer launched in 1940 and stricken in 1972
- Mariz e Barros, a Gearing-class destroyer acquired from the United States in 1973 and expended as a target in 2000
