= Mariz (name) =

Mariz is a feminine given name. Notable people with the name are as follows:

- Mariz Kemal (born 1950), Russian poet

== Stage name ==
- Mariz Umali, stage name of Marie Grace Michelle Bade Umali-Tima (born 1979), Filipino television news anchor and journalist
