= Brazilian ironclad Herval =

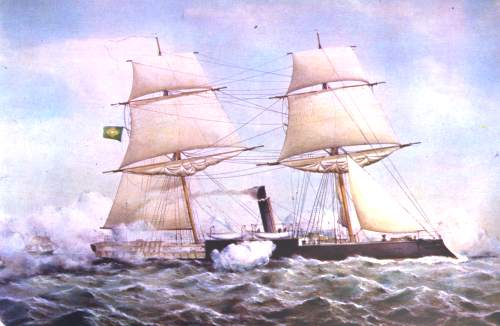

History

Empire of Brazil
- Name: Herval
- Namesake: Marquis of Herval
- Fate: Discarded c. 1885

General characteristics
- Type: Armored central battery ship
- Displacement: 1,353 metric tons (1,332 long tons)
- Length: 58.22 m (191 ft 0 in)
- Beam: 10.97 m (36 ft 0 in)
- Draft: 2.90 m (9 ft 6 in)
- Installed power: 600 ihp (450 kW)
- Propulsion: 2 shafts, 1 steam engine
- Speed: 9 knots (17 km/h; 10 mph)
- Complement: 125 officers and men
- Armament: 4 × rifled 70-pounder Whitworth guns
- Armor: Belt: 4.5 in (110 mm); Casemate: 3 in (76 mm)

The Brazilian ironclad Herval was a Mariz e Barros-class ironclad corvette operated by the Imperial Brazilian Navy from 1866 to 1879. It participated in the battles of the Paraguayan War.

== Design and description ==
Herval was an iron-hulled, fully rigged central battery ship. It was 191 feet (58 m) long. The ship had a beam of 36 feet (11 m) and a maximum draft of 9 feet 6 inches (2.90 m). Herval displaced 1,353 metric tons (1,332 long tons). Its crew consisted of 125 men. The engines produced a total of 600 indicated horsepower (450 kW) and gave Herval a maximum speed of 9 knots (17 km/h; 10 mph). Herval was armed with four 70-pounder Whitworth rifled muzzle-loading guns. The ship was protected by a 4.5-inch (110 mm) iron belt and 3 inches (76 mm) at the casemate.

== Construction ==
Herval was built at the shipyards in Plymouth, England. It was the second ship to bear the name Herval, in honor of general Manuel Luís Osório, Marquis of Erval. The ship was originally ordered by Paraguay, who named it Medusa, but it was sold to Brazil as the Paraguayans, in financial difficulties due to the ongoing Paraguayan War, were unable to pay for it. It belongs to the same class as the armored corvette Mariz e Barros. The ship arrived in Brazil on 30 May 1866 and on 19 July of the same year it was officially named Herval, being incorporated into the navy also in the same year under the command of first lieutenant Tomás Pedro de Bittencourt Cotrim.

== Service ==
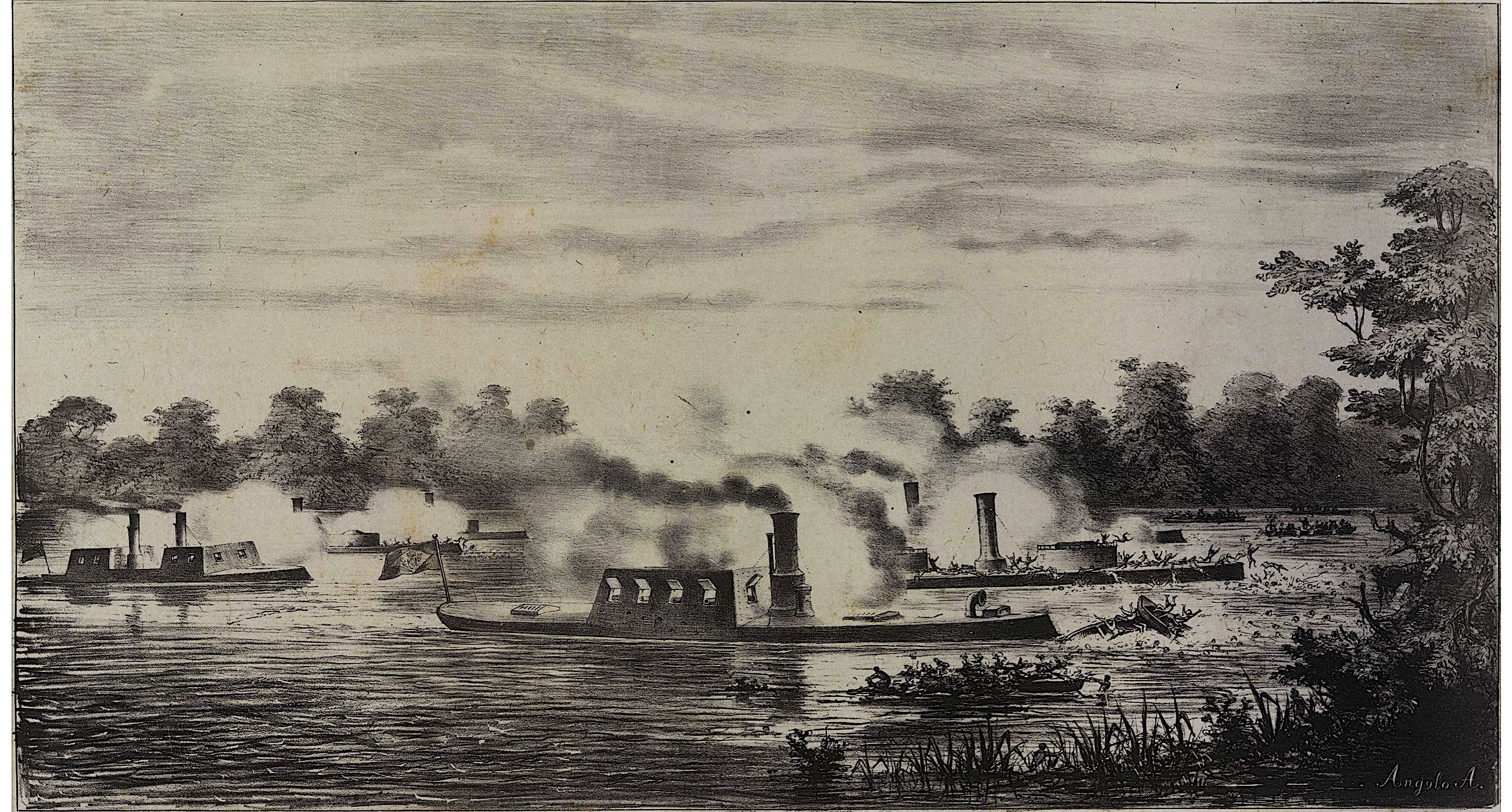
The ironclads Silvado, Brasil, Mariz e Barros and Herval repelling the Paraguayan boarding attempt on 2 March 1868

Its main actions took place during the Paraguayan War. On 2 February 1867, Herval participated in the bombing of Curupayty. On 2 March 1868, together with the ironclad Brasil, it went to the aid of the ironclads Lima Barros and Cabral, repelling a Paraguayan attempt to board the ships. Also in 1868, it took part in operations in Curupayty, Humaitá and Angostura.

After the war, it underwent renovation in 1875 in Rio de Janeiro. It was decommissioned in 1879, with its machines being removed to be used in the corvette Primeiro de Março.

== Bibliography ==
- Branfill-Cook, Roger (2018). River Gunboats: An Illustrated Encyclopaedia. Seaforth Publishing. ISBN 978-1-84832-365-0.
- Gratz, George A. (1999). "The Brazilian Imperial Navy Ironclads, 1865–1874". In Preston, Antony (ed.). Warship 1999–2000. Conway Maritime Press. ISBN 0-85177-724-4.
- Lyon, Hugh (1979). "Brazil". In Chesneau, Roger & Kolesnik, Eugene M. (eds.). Conway's All the World's Fighting Ships 1860–1905. Conway Maritime Press. ISBN 0-85177-133-5.
