= Brazilian ironclad Lima Barros =

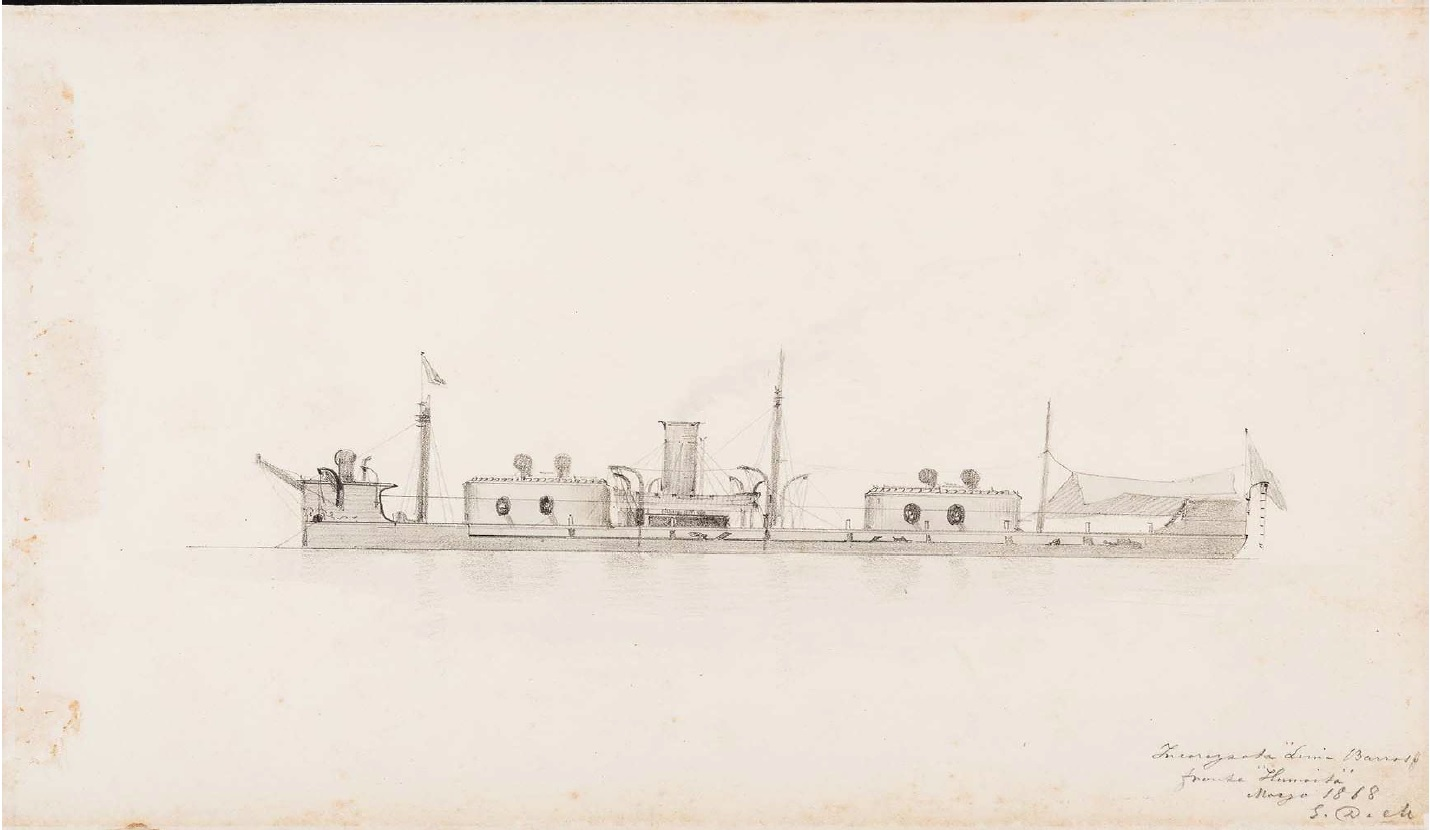
- A drawing of Lima Barros

Class overview
- Name: Lima Barros class
- Operators: Imperial Brazilian Navy
- Preceded by: Brasil
- Succeeded by: Barroso
- Completed: 1
- Scrapped: 1

History

Empire of Brazil
- Name: Lima Barros
- Namesake: Midshipman Francisco Jose de Lima Barros
- Builder: Laird Brothers, Birkenhead
- Laid down: 1864
- Launched: 21 December 1865
- Completed: 3 April 1866
- Stricken: 8 May 1894
- Fate: Scrapped, 1905

General characteristics
- Type: Ironclad turret ship
- Displacement: 1,705 long tons (1,732 t)
- Length: 200 ft 2 in (61.0 m) (p/p)
- Beam: 38 ft 2 in (11.6 m)
- Draft: 12 ft 8 in (3.9 m)
- Installed power: 2,100 ihp (1,600 kW)
- Propulsion: 2 shafts, 2 trunk steam engines
- Sail plan: Barque-rigged
- Speed: 12 knots (22 km/h; 14 mph)
- Complement: 170 officers and men
- Armament: 2 × twin 120-pounder Whitworth rifled muzzle loader guns
- Armor: Belt: 3–4.5 in (76–114 mm); Gun turret: 4.5 in (114 mm)

The Brazilian ironclad Lima Barros was originally ordered by Paraguay in 1864 with the name Belona, but was sold to Brazil when Paraguay could not make the final payments. She participated in the 1864–70 Paraguayan War between Brazil, Argentina and Uruguay against Paraguay.

== Design and description ==
Lima Barros was designed as an enlarged, twin-turret, version of the river monitor Bahia. The ship was 200 feet 2 inches (61.0 m) long between perpendiculars, had a beam of 38 feet 2 inches (11.6 m) and a maximum draft of 12 feet 8 inches (3.9 m). Lima Barros displaced 1,705 long tons (1,732 t) and was fitted with a ram bow. Her crew consisted of 170 officers and enlisted men. The ship had a pair of horizontal trunk steam engines, each driving one propeller shaft. The engines produced a total of 2,100 indicated horsepower (1,600 kW) and gave Lima Barros a maximum speed of 12 knots (22 km/h; 14 mph). She was barque-rigged with three pole masts and a bowsprit.

Lima Barros was armed with four 120-pounder Whitworth rifled, muzzle-loading guns mounted in two twin-gun turrets. She had a complete waterline belt of wrought iron that ranged in thickness from 4.5 inches (114 mm) amidships to 3 inches (76 mm) at the ends of the ship. The gun turret was also protected by 4.5 inches of armor.

== Construction and service ==
Lima Barros, named after Midshipman Francisco Jose de Lima Barros, who was killed at the Battle of Riachuelo, was originally ordered by Paraguay from the British shipbuilding firm of Laird Brothers and was laid down in 1864 with the name of Belona and the yard number 327 at their Birkenhead shipyard. She was purchased by Brazil the following year, after the start of the war when Paraguay was cut off from the outside world and could no longer make payments. The ship was launched on 21 December 1865 and completed on 3 April 1866. She played a prominent role in the Paraguayan War, being one of the vessels successfully to run the gauntlet of a Paraguayan fort at the Passage of Curupayty.

== See also ==
- List of historical ships of the Brazilian Navy
