= 120-pounder Whitworth naval gun =

120-pounder Whitworth gun
- Type: Naval gun
- Place of origin: United Kingdom

Service history
- In service: 1865–
- Used by: Brazil
- Wars: Paraguayan War

Production history
- Designer: Joseph Whitworth
- Manufacturer: Joseph Whitworth
- Produced: 1865?–

Specifications
- Mass: 16,660 pounds (7,556.8 kg)
- Length: 144 inches (3.658 m)
- Shell: Solid shot Explosive shell
- Shell weight: 151 pounds (68.5 kg)
- Calibre: 7-inch (178 mm)
- Maximum firing range: about 5,540 yards (5,070 m)
- Filling: Black powder
- Filling weight: 5 pounds (2.3 kg)

The 120-pounder Whitworth naval gun was designed by Joseph Whitworth during the 1860s. It was a rifled muzzle loader and used his hexagonal rifled bore design, the principle of which is described in the article on the 70-pounder Whitworth naval gun.

== Service ==
A number of 120-pounders were bought by the Imperial Brazilian Navy and used to arm some of its ironclads during the Paraguayan War in the late 1860s.
