= Manduvirá River Expeditions =

- Part of the Campaign of the Hills of the Paraguayan War
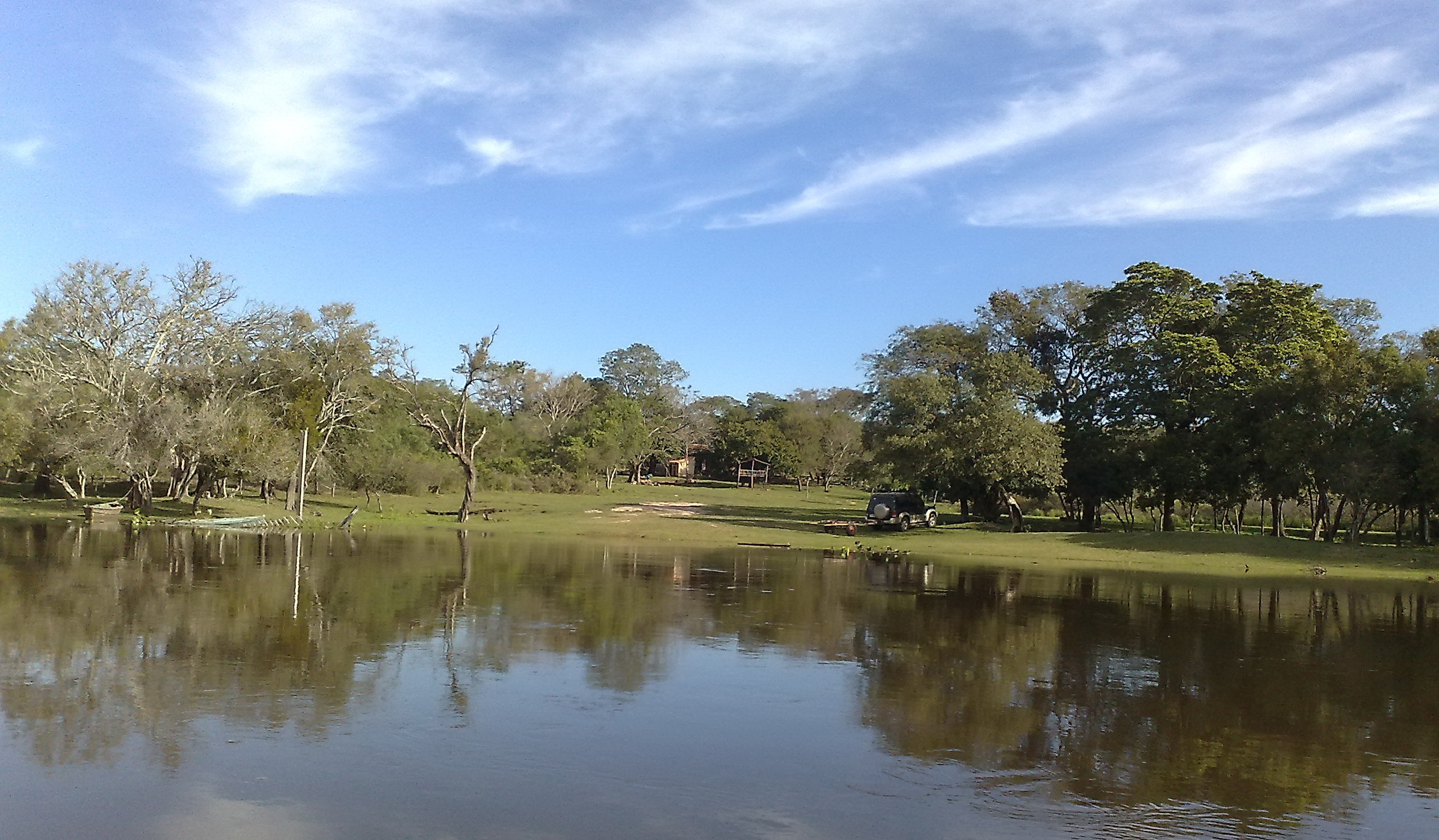
- Port Naranjahai seen from the Manduvirá River
Date	January 5th to August 20th, 1869
Location	Manduvirá River, Paraguay
Result	Brazilian victory

Belligerents
Empire of Brazil	Paraguay

Commanders and leaders
Baron of Passagem	Solano López

Strength
1 corvette 2 ironclads 3 gunboats 5 monitors 6 launches	8 steamers, 180 sailors and 1,100 soldiers

Casualties and losses
5 killed 6 wounded	All ships sunk or destroyed, over 100 killed

The Manduvirá River Expeditions were the final operations of the Imperial Brazilian Navy carried out on the Paraguayan War. The goal of the imperial fleet was to carry out explorations along the river and its streams, with the aim of capturing or destroying the remaining ships of the Paraguayan armada that had taken refuge. The Brazilian fleet was composed of 18 ships, including battleships, monitors, gunboats and steamboats while the Paraguayan fleet had about 12 steamers. A total of three expeditions were carried out, which proved to be extremely dangerous for Brazilian ships due to the shallow waters, the sinuosity of the river and the blockades created by the Paraguayans.

The ships encountered obstructions made of logs from the hulls of sunken ships, large piled trees, canoes, iron chains and carts loaded with stones created to delay the pursuit. Due to the narrowness of the river, ships sometimes had to turn astern, given the impossibility of turning and heading. In the second expedition, considered the most violent, the Brazilian fleet had to face a garrison of 1,100 men at Passo Guarayo, a very well fortified place. The expeditions, which began in January 1869 and ended in August of the same year, were responsible for the annihilation of the Paraguayan Navy. In the 1970s, a museum was created on the site where some ships that were recovered from Manduvirá are preserved.

== Background ==
The Paraguayan navy had played an important role in many events during the war. With the advance of the Brazilian fleet along the Paraguay River, the fleet contributed with the transport of people and materials, as due to the withdrawal of the Fortress of Humaitá, construction of Fortín's batteries on the Tebicuary River and in the Angostura fort, in addition to supplying these positions with resources coming from Paraguay and the occupied province of Mato Grosso. However, like the army, López's navy suffered from the withdrawal of its forces, due to the great losses suffered during the five years of conflict. Since the fighting was now inland, in the region of the Cordilleras, López decided to disarm on November 28, 1868. His steamers were in a sufficient number to accommodate a small garrison to navigate the waters of the Manduvirá River. This garrison had been prepared to disembark the artillery from the unarmed ships, put them on carts and organize themselves into a battalion of 300 soldiers. The Brazilian imperial armada detached some ships and in three expeditions capture or destroy of what was left of the Paraguayan armada.

== First Expedition ==
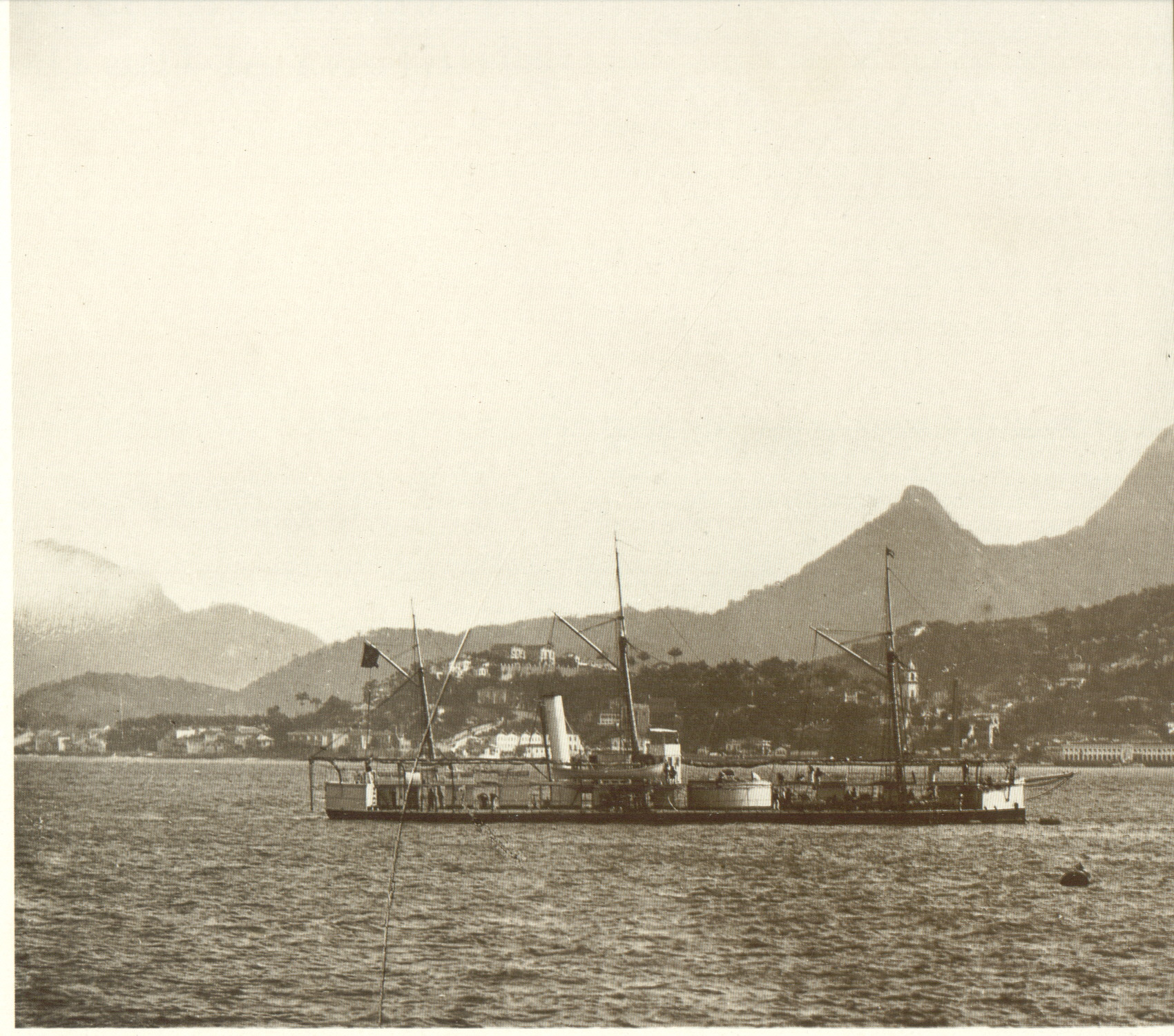
The Battleship Bahia around 1870

On November 28, the Brazilian fleet launched a final bombardment of the Paraguayan capital Asunción, destroying one of the turrets of the presidential palace and damaging several other public buildings, including the shipyard. The fleet consisted of the battleships Bahia and Tamandaré and the monitors Alagoas and Rio Grande do Sul. Taking advantage of the flood, the naval high command organized a flotilla composed of some ships that participated in the bombing and others: the battleship Bahia, as flagship, the monitors Alagoas, Ceará, Pará, Piauí, Santa Catharina and the gunboats Ivaí and Mearim, being commanded by Delfim Carlos de Carvalho, Baron of the Passagem. The Brazilian goal was to capture or destroy the small Paraguayan fleet that had taken refuge, due to such a disproportion of forces in the Manduvirá River. The expedition began at dawn on January 5, 1869, with the help of a Paraguayan pilot, a naval officer whose name was not registered. At 4:30 pm, the fleet anchored at the mouth of the Manduvirá. After quick reconnaissance of the place, it was decided that Bahia, Ivaí and Mearim had to remain there to block the exit, since they were not able to navigate the river, which was considered to be very tortuous.

Early on, the fleet encountered many difficulties. After the change of the flagship from Bahia to Santa Catharina, the ships started to go up the river on the 6th. The water course was tortuous and the monitors' difficulty in maneuvering made them crash into trees and ravines. Throughout the pursuit, the Paraguayans used various stratagems to hamper the advance of the imperial fleet, such as sinking their own ships in order to block the passage. The first sighting of the Paraguayans occurred at 14:00, with the steamer Piravevé which served as a sentry. This was one of the eight ships that formed the pursued flotilla and were crewed by around 180 men in total, under the command of Aniceto López. Faced with this first contact, commander Delfim Carlos de Carvalho ordered his fleet to full force, but it was only at 6 pm that they managed to reach the Paraguayan ships. On the Paraguayan side, the situation was extremely disadvantageous, as their vessels carried no artillery and, even if they were, they were no match for the Brazilian battleship monitors, so they did not offer resistance. One of the first ships that the Imperials found sinking was a longboat with six crew members who, with a white flag extended, surrendered to the Brazilians. They reported that, on López's orders, they had been sinking ships since the morning of that day. Returning to the hunt for Paraguayan vessels, at 19:00 the Baron of Passagem ordered the interruption of the march of the monitors, as the Paraguayan ships entered an even narrower stream of Manduvirá known as the Iaguí stream.

The next day, the Baron of Passagem decided to enter the stream. The winding and narrow stream proved to be more difficult to navigate, added to the difficulties created by the Paraguayan sailors who felled numerous large trees on the bed and logs of the sunken ships. After marching for three hours, covering a little more than 19 kilometers, the Brazilians found the Paraguayans set ashore to block navigation. This resulted in the end of the chase, after finding the obstacle insurmountable. Since the stream was too narrow for even the 36-meter-long small monitors, the fleet's return had to be made sailing astern, as turning and heading was impossible. On the way back they found the steamer Cotitey which was submerged. The monitors Ceará and Piauí expended considerable efforts in an attempt to tow the steamer, and Ceará had to relocate twice due to the difficulty of navigation. Faced with the situation, they decided to abandon the steamer and return. The flotilla reached the vessels that were blocking the mouth of the Manduvirá just at 5:30 pm on 8 January. The entire fleet started the return to Asunción and during the maneuvers Pará hit a log with her stern, breaking the rudder and had to be towed by Alagoas. The difficulty encountered in this task forced Pará to descend the river by its own means and, reaching the Paraguay River, it could be safely towed by the Ivaí to Asunción. On the 9th, at 10:30 am, all the ships of the first expedition were parked in the Paraguayan capital.

== Second Expedition ==
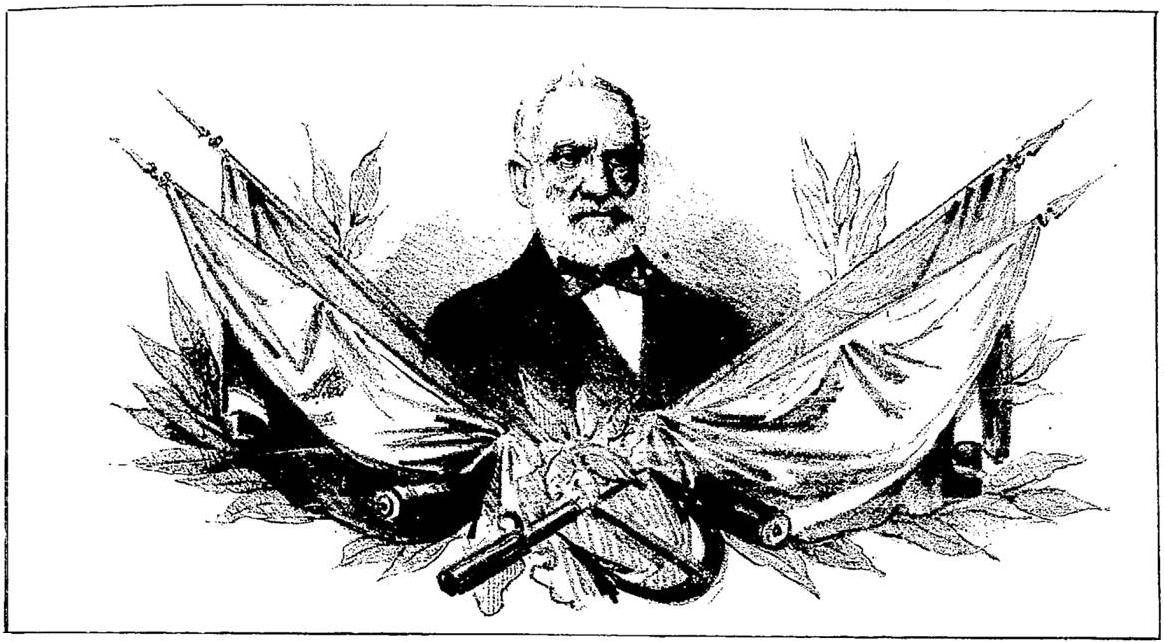
Elisiário Antônio dos Santos replaced the Viscount of Inhaúma as commander of the naval forces in Paraguay.

Changes in the Brazilian forces as made as Squadron Chief Elisiário Antônio dos Santos replaced Joaquim José Inácio, Viscount of Inhaúma. The resumption of operations was facilitated by better weather conditions such as the constant rains which resulted in the increase in the volume of the rivers. Since the last expedition, the Manduvirá remained blocked, now by the battleship Colombo and the corvette Belmonte. For the second expedition, command of the operation was entrusted to the commander of the first division, Victório José Barbosa de Lomba; command of the flotilla was given to the commander of Columbus, Frigate Captain Jerônimo Francisco Gonçalves. The new fleet consisted of the following monitors: Santa Catarina, Piauí and Ceará, commanded by first lieutenants Antônio Severiano Nunes, Carlos Balthazar da Silveira, and Antônio Machado Dutra respectively; steamboats Couto, João das Botas and Jansen Müller with the last two commanded by First Lieutenant Gregário Ferreira de Paiva and Second Lieutenant Affonso Augusto Rodrigues de Vasconcellos respectively. The fleet had several pilots such as Bernadino Gustavino, Thomaz Almuri, Thomaz Araújo, and a doctor, Dr. Oliveira Coutinho.

The Gonçalves flotilla began the pursuit on 18 April. In this new expedition, the ships were accompanied by Paraguayan cavalry forces. The ships took about 6 days to reach the village of Caraguatay; always at night when the ships anchored they were carefully watched. On this route, the Paraguayan troops did not harass them because they hoped that they could cut the fleet's rear and completely massacre the garrisons on the way back. On the 20th, a detachment under the command of Captain Fonseca Ramos, who was advancing along the river, he was surprised by three lines of Paraguayan snipers, causing the loss of four men and leaving some wounded. The detachment's mission was to prevent the column that accompanied Solano López through the mountain ranges from being resupplied by the river. The tracking of the fleet by the Paraguayans was possible due to the multiple curves that the river had, in addition to the ease of perceiving when the ships were close by the sight of the high masts and the smoke from the chimneys. According to Brazilian records, the fleet traveled around 289.68 to 337.93 km to where the Paraguayan fleet was. On the 24th, the lack of supplies began to become noticeable on the ships. This made travel even more difficult by the further distance they had traveled. Immediately, the commander ordered two launches to return to fetch provisions. Such a return was dangerous because the fleet had passed the rear of a Paraguayan camp and this represented an affliction for Commander Gonçalves, since it wasn't known whether the launches had managed to pass safely. The small boats arrived at the mouth of the Manduvirá on the 26th and, when supplied, soon set sail back upstream.

On the 25th, the Brazilian fleet was sighted from half a league away by the Paraguayan ships that were stationed in Vila de Caraguatay, but were prevented from advancing further because of the shallow waters that didn't allow even a small launch to navigate according to the Diário de Belém on June 4. Commander Gonçalves decided to advance on foot to a nearby pass where people and cattle passed, from where he could observe the masts of Paraguayan ships. They were planning an assault to destroy the vessels, but they were surrounded by a regiment of cavalry supported by an infantry. Desperate, Gonçalves and his men managed to retreat to the monitors and prepare for battle. But the Paraguayans didn't fight and remained stationary. Faced with the calm, the officers, seeing that the volume of the river continued to decrease, decided to do something unusual: When they were in the sight of the Paraguayans, they would set fire to their own ships before handing them over in the event of an attack. In this scenario, the Brazilians were at a disadvantage, as the monitors did not have the space to accommodate many troops, in addition to the low rivers that didn't allow safe navigation. The Paraguayans, on the other hand, were very well defended and had a large garrison but the reality remained that the Brazilians couldn't attack. Even so, Gonçalves ordered the fleet to remain there until the arrival of the launches that had returned to the mouth of the Manduvirá in search of provisions and thus, in a possible flood of the river, he could destroy the Paraguayan ships. This plan wasn't carried out however as, on the night of the 26th, the sound of Paraguayan axes cutting trees near the Brazilian division could be heard, in order to block the rear and the next day the commander gives orders for the fleet to retreat due to concerns about the proximity of the Paraguayans and lack of supplies since the launches had not yet arrived. Since the river was very narrow, the fleet had to return sailing astern.

On the way back, the fleet had great difficulty navigating due to the numerous cut trees thrown into the river, clogging it up. This one just wasn't completely stuck because the ships left in time and interrupted the work of cuts of the Paraguayans. According to Jourdan, the Paraguayans' intention was to waste the Brazilians time as a distraction. The logs were stacked together and tied with strong leather straps. Ceará had the task of clearing the way, carried out with a hatchet by the crew. The Paraguayan plan was to close the back of the monitors, which had been entrusted to Frigate Captain Romualdo Nuñez, with a large contingent. Despite an incessant search for a favorable location for action, the plan did not come to fruition due to a disagreement among officials on how to execute it. The two launches with the supplies reached the fleet on the afternoon of the 28th, reporting that they had found a point of fortifications being built in a Guarayo pass. The speedboats were attacked by fusillade shots and attempts to approach, with some wounded among the crew. Faced with this, the fleet rushed to pass that location, but they were not successful due to the difficulties imposed by the river, having to postpone a new attempt to the next day.

=== Guarayo Pass ===
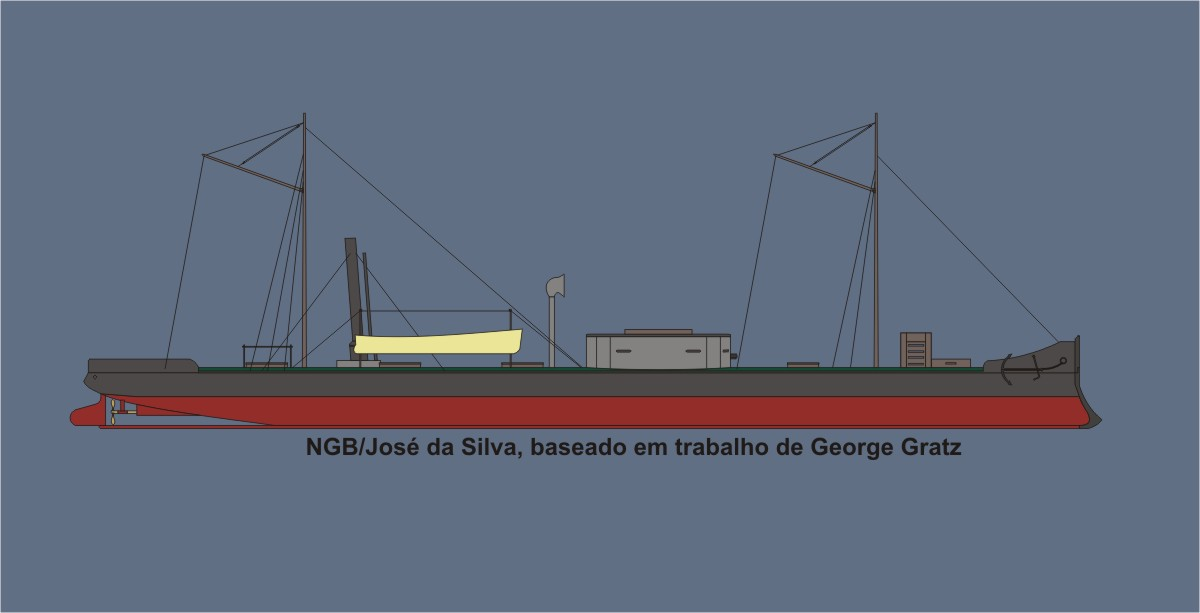
An artistic representation of a Pará-class monitor of the expedition.

On the 29th, between 7 and 8 am, the squadron commander decided to force the passage of Guarayo. The squadron was faced with the fortifications being manned by 1,100 men distributed between the trenches on both sides and with at least 2 artillery pieces at their disposal. He then directly made a blockade made with beams, trees, canoes, iron chains, ropes four times pasted, and carts full of stone. Before starting the passage, the Paraguayans had tried to destroy the Jansen Müller launch by sending two torpedoes towards it, while it was recognizing the buoyancy of a beam. Upon learning, 1st Lieutenant Vasconcellos signaled to Ceará, which was at her stern, from danger and set sail at full speed where the squadron was to give the warning. Immediately the fleet began to pass quickly, having Ceará as the spearhead of the squadron, since their machines were more powerful. The monitors, who passed at a safe distance from Ceará, so as not to disturb it, were under intense fire from coastal artillery but didn't respond immediately with their cannons. Even under intense fire and obstacles from the river, the monitor Ceará managed to break the blockade imposed by the enemy with the support of her squadmates. After overcoming the obstacles, the monitors return and anchor in front of the enemy, initiating the bombardment of the fortified positions on both sides. The Paraguayans responded with lively fire from their cannons and about 200 men try to approach the monitors. The combat lasted about 5 hours and resulted in great casualties for the Paraguayans. About 100 of those who attempted the blockade were killed, in addition to those on the shores and others who were captured. The defeat infuriated López, who ordered the immediate arrest of the commander who allowed the imperials to pass. On the Brazilian side, there was only one death and six injuries, among which the machinist Júlio Raposo de Mello stands out, who was hit twice and removed one of the bullets with his own hands.

After passing through, the squadron headed for the mouth of the Manduvirá and arrived there around the afternoon of the 30th, reaching Asunción on the same day, thus ending the second expedition. Gonçalves was praised by Emperor D. Pedro II for his courage and success in this operation. However, the high command was criticized by Artur Silveira da Mota, Baron of Jaceguai, as the Baron of Passagem had said that the Paraguayan ships were being sunk and the mouth of the river was completely blocked, so such an expedition was not justified because there was no way for the remains. of the Paraguayan navy to offer any danger to the fleet anchored in the Paraguay River.

== Third Expedition ==
The river was blocked with the end of the second expedition and the steamboat João das Botas carried out an exploration of about 50 km on July 7 without finding anything. A little over a month after this exploration, Paraguayan troops moved in order to cross the Manduvirá to meet with López's troops in the Cordillera. Aware of this operation, Commander Elisiário ordered a new expedition with the objective of preventing such a crossing and commissioned the following vessels for the mission: Iguatemi gunboat, the steamboats Tebicuari, Inhaúma, Jejuí and the steamboat Lindóia. They were given the task of sailing as far as possible to avoid the passage of enemy troops. The new flotilla departed on August 17, 1869, while also having the order to "to make fly" to the steamers that were still interned since January in the Iaguí stream.

The first obstacle encountered by the steamers, on the 18th, was a stone-built barrier on the bed of the Guarayo pass, with a small passage wide enough to fit a canoe. The garrison quickly began work to clear this blockage. From the masts, the sailors saw men taking cattle towards the mountain range, in addition to enemy forces following the Brazilians from the shores, as in other expeditions. Due to the low tides, the speedboats had to return however the gunboat Iguatemi sailed a few kilometers from the mouth, as the shallow water prevented it from advancing, remaining in Passo Orqueta. Resuming the expedition, the flotilla encountered a family of Brazilians who had been captured from the province of Mato Grosso. They are sent to Asunción. On the same day, a Brazilian vanguard commanded by General Câmarahe dispersed some Paraguayan sailors who, on the way, set fire to the interned vessels, a total of six: the Piravevé, Anhambaí, Salto de Guairá, Apa, Paraná and Yporá. On the 20th of August, the Conde d'Eu arrived at the place where the vapors were burning.

== Aftermath ==
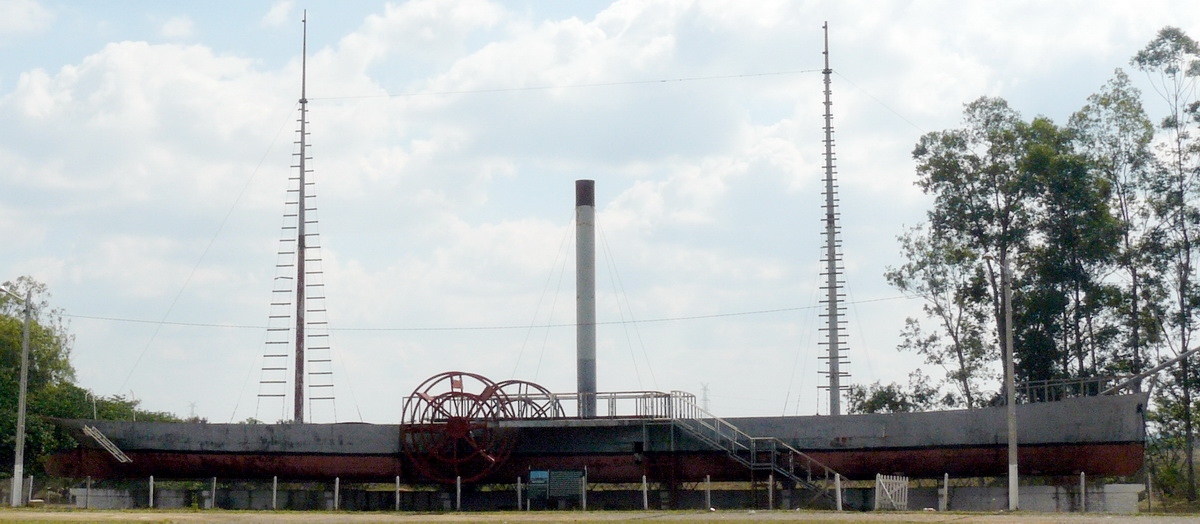
The steamer Anhambaí, one of the ships recovered from Manduvirá. It is preserved in the Vapor Cué National Park, Caraguatay.

With the exception of some explorations organized in September and October of that year, the Manduvirá River was declared free for navigation from as far as Rosário, becoming a line of communication with the army troops. The expeditions represented a serious risk for the Imperial Brazilian Navy due to the extreme difficulties that the ships faced, especially in the second expedition, where the fighting was more violent. If Nuñez's plan to close the monitors from the rear had been carried out, the result would have been catastrophic for the armada.

The fighting on the river sealed the end of the Paraguayan Navy, as the last ships that were in service were destroyed both by the Brazilian hands and by their own sailors. In the 1970s, the Paraguayan government organized itself to recover some steamers that were, until that date, buried in the place. Work was carried out to recover, catalog and create an open-air museum called the Vapor Cué National Park, based on the remains of the six ships that were in one of the Manduvirá streams, the Iaguí.
