= Brazilian monitor Pará =

Imperial Brazilian Navy's Pará-class river monitors

History

Empire of Brazil
- Name: Pará
- Namesake: Pará
- Ordered: 1866
- Builder: Arsenal de Marinha da Côrte, Rio de Janeiro
- Laid down: 8 December 1866
- Launched: 21 May 1867
- Completed: 15 June 1867
- Fate: Discarded 10 December 1884

General characteristics
- Class & type: Pará-class monitor
- Displacement: 500 metric tons (490 long tons)
- Length: 39 m (127 ft 11 in)
- Beam: 8.54 m (28 ft 0 in)
- Draft: 1.51–1.54 m (5.0–5.1 ft) (mean)
- Installed power: 180 ihp (130 kW)
- Propulsion: 2 shafts, 2 steam engines, 2 boilers
- Speed: 8 knots (15 km/h; 9.2 mph)
- Complement: 8 officers and 35 men
- Armament: 1 × 70-pounder Whitworth gun
- Armor: Belt: 51–102 mm (2.0–4.0 in); Gun turret: 76–152 mm (3.0–6.0 in); Deck: 12.7 mm (0.50 in)

The Brazilian monitor Pará was the lead ship of the Pará-class river monitors built for the Brazilian Navy during the Paraguayan War in the late 1860s. Pará participated in the Passagem de Humaitá in February 1868 and provided fire support for the army for the rest of the war. The ship was assigned to the Mato Grosso Flotilla after the war. Pará was disarmed and discarded in 1884.

== Design and description ==
The Pará-class monitors were designed to meet the need of the Brazilian Navy for small, shallow-draft armored ships capable of withstanding heavy fire. The monitor configuration was chosen as a turreted design did not have the same problems engaging enemy ships and fortifications as did the casemate ironclads already in Brazilian service. The oblong gun turret sat on a circular platform that had a central pivot. It was rotated by four men via a system of gears; 2.25 minutes were required for a full 360° rotation. A bronze ram was fitted to these ships as well. The hull was sheathed with Muntz metal to reduce biofouling.

The ships measured 39 meters (127 ft 11 in) long overall, with a beam of 8.54 meters (28 ft 0 in). They had a draft between of 1.51–1.54 meters (4 ft 11 in – 5 ft 1 in) and displaced 500 metric tons (490 long tons). With only 0.3 meters (1 ft 0 in) of freeboard they had to be towed between Rio de Janeiro and their area of operations. Their crew numbered 43 officers and men.

=== Propulsion ===
The Pará-class ships had two direct-acting steam engines, each driving a single 1.3-meter (4 ft 3 in) propeller. Their engines were powered by two tubular boilers at a working pressure of 59 psi (407 kPa; 4 kgf/cm^{2}). The engines produced a total of 180 indicated horsepower (130 kW) which gave the monitors a maximum speed of 8 knots (15 km/h; 9.2 mph) in calm waters. The ships carried enough coal for one day's steaming.

=== Armament ===
Pará carried a single 70-pounder Whitworth rifled muzzle loader (RML) in her gun turret. The 70-pounder gun had a maximum elevation of 15°. It had a maximum range of 5,540 meters (6,060 yd). The 70-pounder gun weighed 8,582 pounds (3,892.7 kg) and fired a 5.5-inch (140 mm) shell that weighed 81 pounds (36.7 kg). Most unusually the gun's Brazilian-designed iron carriage was designed to pivot vertically at the muzzle; this was done to minimize the size of the gunport through which splinters and shells could enter.

=== Armor ===
The hull of the Pará-class ships was made from three layers of wood that alternated in orientation. It was 457 millimeters (18.0 in) thick and was capped with a 102-millimeter (4 in) layer of peroba hardwood. The ships had a complete wrought iron waterline belt, 0.91 meters (3.0 ft) high. It had a maximum thickness of 102 millimeters amidships, decreasing to 76 millimeters (3 in) and 51 millimeters (2 in) at the ship's ends. The curved deck was armored with 12.7 millimeters (0.5 in) of wrought iron.

The gun turret was shaped like a rectangle with rounded corners. It was built much like the hull, but the front of the turret was protected by 152 millimeters (6 in) of armor, the sides by 102 millimeters and the rear by 76 millimeters. Its roof and the exposed portions of the platform it rested upon were protected by 12.7 millimeters of armor. The armored pilothouse was positioned ahead of the turret.

== Service ==
Pará was laid down at the Arsenal de Marinha da Côrte in Rio de Janeiro on 8 December 1866, during the Paraguayan War, which saw Argentina and Brazil allied against Paraguay. She was launched on 21 May 1867 and commissioned on 15 June 1867. She was towed to the Río de la Plata on 20 June 1867 and steamed up the Paraná River, although her passage further north was barred by the Paraguayan fortifications at Humaitá. On 19 February 1868 six Brazilian ironclads, including Pará, sailed past Humaitá at night. Pará and her two sister ships, Alagoas and Rio Grande, were lashed to the larger ironclads in case any engines were disabled by the Paraguayan guns. Barroso led with Rio Grande, followed by Bahia with Alagoas and Tamandaré with Pará. The monitor had to be beached after passing the fortress to prevent her from sinking. Pará was repaired by 27 February when she joined a squadron dispatched to capture the town of Laureles. On 15 October she bombarded Angostura Fort in company with Brasil, Silvado, Rio Grande and her sister Ceará. On 17 May 1869 she joined a blockading squadron on the Jejuy and Araguaya Rivers. After the war Pará was assigned to the newly formed Mato Grosso Flotilla. She was disarmed and discarded on 10 December 1884 at Ladário.
