= Brazilian monitor Rio Grande =

Imperial Brazilian Navy's Pará-class river monitors

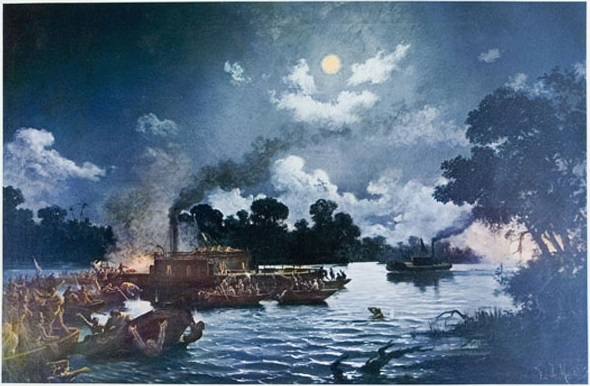
- Paraguayans trying to board the ironclad Barroso and the monitor Rio Grande (in the background).

History

Empire of Brazil
- Name: Rio Grande
- Namesake: Rio Grande do Sul
- Ordered: 1866
- Builder: Arsenal de Marinha da Corte, Rio de Janeiro
- Laid down: 8 December 1866
- Launched: 17 August 1867
- Completed: 3 September 1867
- Fate: Scrapped February 1907

General characteristics
- Class & type: Pará-class monitor
- Displacement: 500 metric tons (490 long tons)
- Length: 39 m (127 ft 11 in)
- Beam: 8.54 m (28 ft 0 in)
- Draft: 1.51–1.54 m (5.0–5.1 ft) (mean)
- Installed power: 180 ihp (130 kW)
- Propulsion: 2 shafts, 2 steam engines, 2 boilers
- Speed: 8 knots (15 km/h; 9.2 mph)
- Complement: 8 officers and 35 men
- Armament: 1 × 70-pounder Whitworth gun
- Armor: Belt: 51–102 mm (2.0–4.0 in); Gun turret: 76–152 mm (3.0–6.0 in); Deck: 12.7 mm (0.50 in)

The Brazilian monitor Rio Grande was the second ship of the Pará-class river monitors built for the Imperial Brazilian Navy during the Paraguayan War in the late 1860s. Rio Grande participated in the Passage of Humaitá on 19 February 1868 and provided fire support for the army for the rest of the war. The ship was assigned to the Upper Uruguay (Portuguese: Alto Uruguai) flotilla after the war. Rio Grande was scrapped in 1907.

== Design and description ==
The Pará-class monitors were designed to meet the need of the Brazilian Navy for small, shallow-draft armored ships capable of withstanding heavy fire. The monitor configuration was chosen as a turreted design did not have the same problems engaging enemy ships and fortifications as did the casemate ironclads already in Brazilian service. The oblong gun turret sat on a circular platform that had a central pivot. It was rotated by four men via a system of gears; 2.25 minutes were required for a full 360° rotation. A bronze ram was fitted to these ships as well. The hull was sheathed with Muntz metal to reduce biofouling.

The ships measured 39 meters (127 ft 11 in) long overall, with a beam of 8.54 meters (28 ft 0 in). They had a draft between of 1.51–1.54 meters (4 ft 11 in – 5 ft 1 in) and displaced 500 metric tons (490 long tons). With only 0.3 meters (1 ft 0 in) of freeboard they had to be towed between Rio de Janeiro and their area of operations. Their crew numbered 43 officers and men.

=== Propulsion ===
The Pará-class ships had two direct-acting steam engines, each driving a single 1.3-meter (4 ft 3 in) propeller. Their engines were powered by two tubular boilers at a working pressure of 59 psi (407 kPa; 4 kgf/cm^{2}). The engines produced a total of 180 indicated horsepower (130 kW) which gave the monitors a maximum speed of 8 knots (15 km/h; 9.2 mph) in calm waters. The ships carried enough coal for one day's steaming.

=== Armament ===
Rio Grande carried a single 70-pounder Whitworth rifled muzzle loader (RML) in her gun turret. The 70-pounder gun had a maximum elevation of 15°. It had a maximum range of 5,540 meters (6,060 yd). The 70-pounder gun weighed 8,582 pounds (3,892.7 kg) and fired a 5.5-inch (140 mm) shell that weighed 81 pounds (36.7 kg). Most unusually the gun's Brazilian-designed iron carriage was designed to pivot vertically at the muzzle; this was done to minimize the size of the gunport through which splinters and shells could enter.

=== Armor ===
The hull of the Pará-class ships was made from three layers of wood that alternated in orientation. It was 457 millimeters (18.0 in) thick and was capped with a 102-millimeter (4 in) layer of peroba hardwood. The ships had a complete wrought iron waterline belt, 0.91 meters (3.0 ft) high. It had a maximum thickness of 102 millimeters amidships, decreasing to 76 millimeters (3 in) and 51 millimeters (2 in) at the ship's ends. The curved deck was armored with 12.7 millimeters (0.5 in) of wrought iron.

The gun turret was shaped like a rectangle with rounded corners. It was built much like the hull, but the front of the turret was protected by 152 millimeters (6 in) of armor, the sides by 102 millimeters and the rear by 76 millimeters. Its roof and the exposed portions of the platform it rested upon were protected by 12.7 millimeters of armor. The armored pilothouse was positioned ahead of the turret.

== Service ==
Rio Grande was laid down at the Arsenal de Marinha da Corte in Rio de Janeiro on 8 December 1866, during the Paraguayan War, which saw Argentina, Uruguay and the Empire of Brazil allied against Paraguay. She was launched on 17 August 1867 and completed on 3 September 1867. She arrived at Montevideo on 6 January 1868 and steamed up the Paraná River, although her passage further north was barred by the Paraguayan fortifications at Humaitá. On 19 February 1868 six Brazilian ironclads, including Rio Grande, sailed past Humaitá at night. Rio Grande and her two sister ships, Alagoas and Pará, were lashed to the larger ironclads in case any engines were disabled by the Paraguayan guns. Barroso led with Rio Grande, followed by Bahia with Alagoas and Tamandaré with Pará. The latter two ships were damaged as they sailed past the fortifications and had to be beached to prevent them from sinking. Rio Grande continued upstream with the other undamaged ships and they bombarded Asunción on 24 February. On 23 March Rio Grande and Barroso sank the Paraguayan steamer Igurey. Paraguayan soldiers in canoes attempted to board both ships on the evening of 9 July, but were only successful in getting on board Rio Grande where they were able to kill Antônio Joaquim, the ship's captain and some of the crew. The remaining crewmembers locked the monitor's hatches and Barroso was able to kill or capture almost all of the Paraguayans on deck. On 15 October she bombarded the Angostura Fort in company with Brasil, Silvado, Pará and her sister Ceará.

After the war Rio Grande was assigned to the newly formed Alto Uruguay Flotilla, based at Itaqui. She was docked in Ladário for rebuilding in 1899, but this was never completed and she was scrapped in February 1907.
