= Brazilian ironclad Cabral =

Cabral-class armored corvette-type warship operated by the Imperial Brazilian Navy

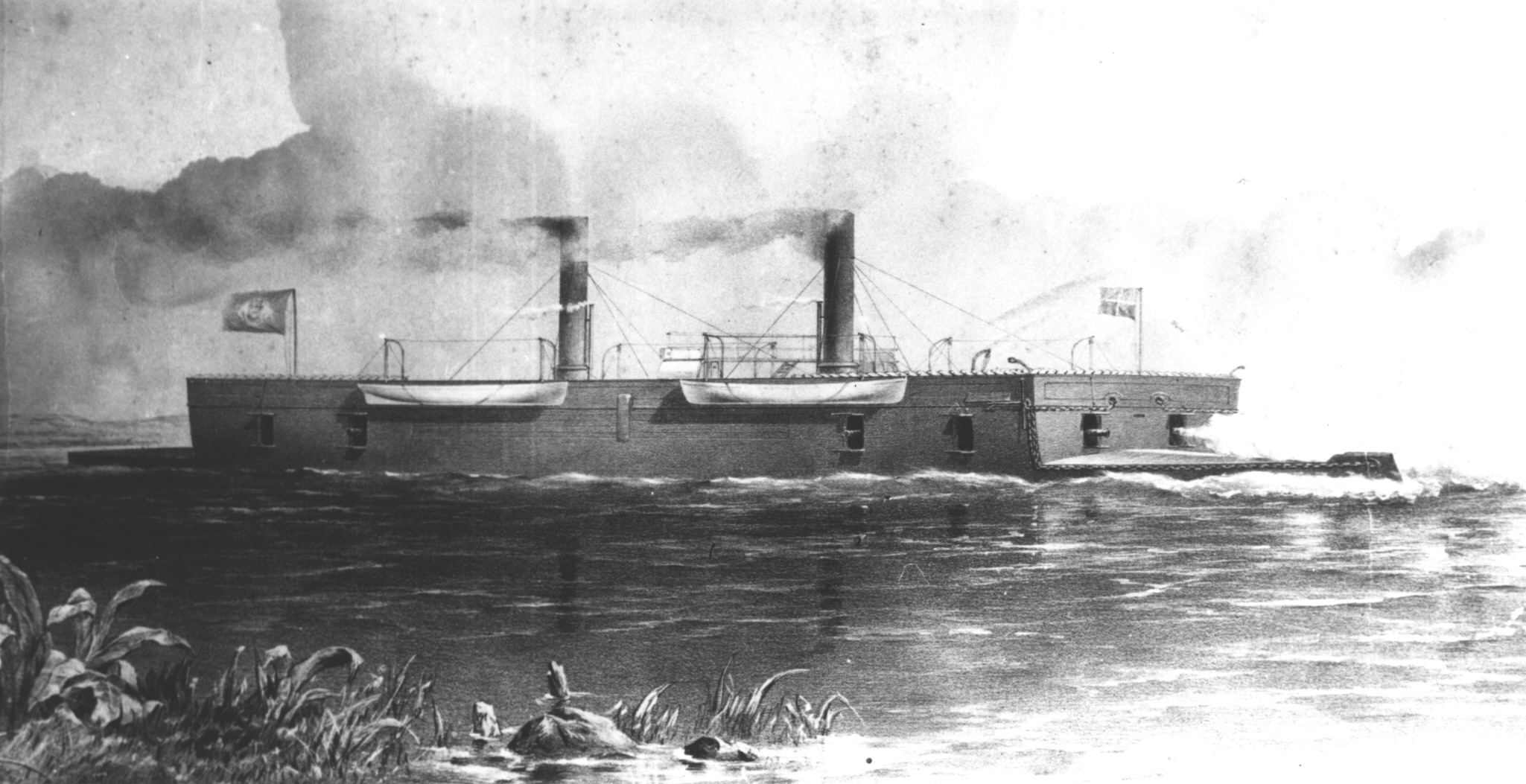

History

Empire of Brazil
- Name: Cabral
- Namesake: Pedro Álvares Cabral
- Commissioned: 1866
- Fate: Scrapped c. 1882

General characteristics
- Type: Cabral-class ironclad
- Displacement: 1,050 metric tons (1,030 long tons)
- Length: 47.54 m (156 ft 0 in)
- Beam: 10.66 m (35 ft 0 in)
- Draft: 2.43 m (8.0 ft)
- Installed power: 750 ihp (560 kW)
- Propulsion: 2 shafts, 2 steam engines
- Speed: 10.5 knots (19.4 km/h; 12.1 mph)
- Complement: 125 officers and men
- Armament: 8 × rifled 70-pounder Whitworth guns
- Armor: Belt: 4.5 in (110 mm); Casemate: 3 in (76 mm)

The Brazilian ironclad Cabral was a Cabral-class armored corvette-type warship operated by the Imperial Brazilian Navy from 1866 to 1882. The vessel was built in the shipyard of the British company J. and G. Rennie in Greenwich, England, and was the leader of its class, which also included Colombo. It was launched in 1865 and incorporated into the navy on 15 September 1866. The battleship was entirely made of iron and displaced 858, 1,033 or 1,050 tons, depending on the source. It had two steam engines that developed up to 750 hp, propelling the vessel at about 20 km/h. Its structure comprised a double pillbox with eight gunports. The navy had great difficulties with this ship, which was hard to navigate and, due to the design of its casemate, which left a part of it unprotected, it was vulnerable to diving projectiles.

A few months after its arrival in Brazil, Cabral was sent to combat in the Paraguayan War. The first obstacle was the Fortress of Curupayty which, together with several other ships of the imperial fleet, Cabral bombarded intensely on 2 February 1867. On August 15, Cabral successfully forced the passage of this fort, a maneuver that lasted for about two hours. After this transposition, on 2 March 1868, Cabral and Lima Barros were approached by about 200 Paraguayans who were on canoes. Cabral was about to be taken by the Paraguayans, when Silvado and Herval approached and repelled them. In July, Cabral participated in the bombing of the Fortress of Humaitá, which it also crossed on the 21st. In this crossing, Cabral demonstrated its poor maneuverability by violently ramming two other ironclads, harming, but not preventing, the maneuver. In August, it surpassed the Timbó fortress and, in October, the Angostura fortress.

In the last years of the war, the battleship was no longer in demand and returned to Rio de Janeiro, where it underwent repairs. In 1873, it was assigned to the third naval division, with the mission of patrolling the Brazilian coast between Mossoró, in Rio Grande do Norte, and the border with French Guiana. In the second half of the 1870s, the ship was relegated to the river battery due to its poor seaworthiness. The navy decommissioned it on 8 November 1882.

== Design and description ==
Cabral was built in Greenwich, England, by the company J. and G. Rennie in 1865. On 15 September 1866, by Letter n. 64 of the Ministry of Navy, the ship underwent an armament display and was incorporated into the Imperial Brazilian Navy. It was first named Nemesis, a mythological Greek goddess, but soon that name was replaced by Cabral (the only Brazilian ship to bear this name), in honor of Portuguese navigator Pedro Álvares Cabral. Cabral was designated as an ironclad corvette and flagship of its class.

The ship was an ironclad, had a displacement of 858 t, (Note: Other sources such as Gardiner and Martini claim the ship displaced 1,033 and 1,050 t respectively.) measured 156 ft (47.54 m) in length, 35 ft (10.66 m) in beam, 11 ft (3.35 m) in depth and 8 feet (2.43 m) of draft. Its machines consisted of two steam engines that developed 240 hp, according to the Brazilian Navy, or 750 hp, according to naval writer Gardiner, which drove two shafts and propelled the ship at 10.5 knots (19.44 km/h). Cabral had a chimney, (Note: Although the source (Marinha do Brasil, p. 1) reports a single chimney, paintings illustrating the ship indicate that it had two.) rudder, a small mast for signals and casemate, and was armed with eight 70 and 68-pounder Withworth cannons. Its crew consisted of 125 enlisted men and officers. The navy considered it a ship with poor nautical qualities, even dangerous, and this judgment proved to be accurate shortly after, when the ship entered combat. Added to this was that the ship was built with a system of double casemates that left, amidships, an unprotected area over the boilers, vulnerable to diving shots. Cabral arrived in Brazil in August 1866, commanded by first lieutenant Jacinto Furtado de Mendonça Paes Lemes.

== History ==
=== Actions in Curupayty ===
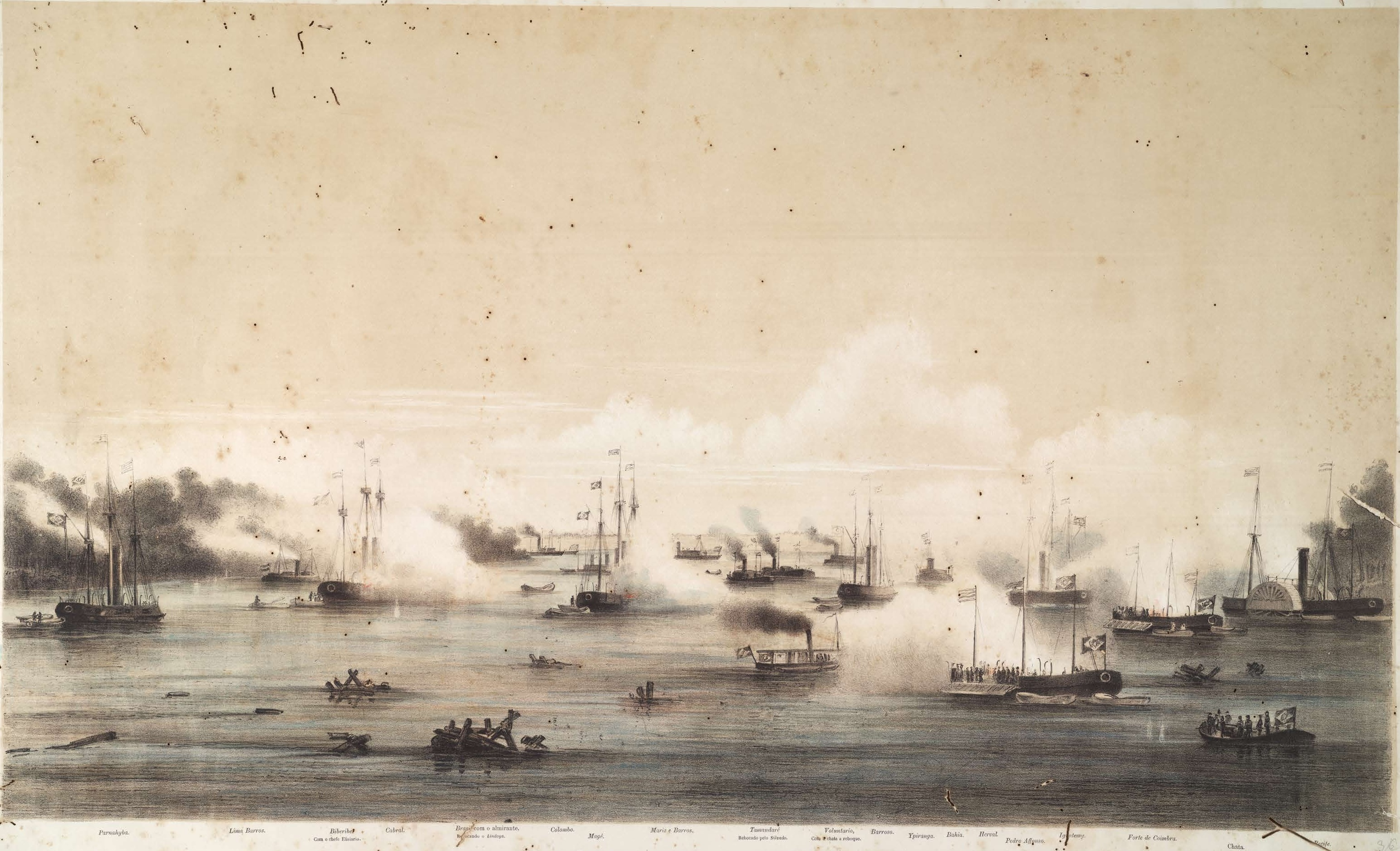
Passage of Curupayty carried out by the armored squad on 15 August 1876

In November 1866, Cabral was sent to the front in the Paraguayan War, and docked on the 30th in Montevideo, Uruguay. On 2 February 1867, already in Paraguayan territory, Cabral and other ships bombarded the Fortress of Curupaiti, which was on the banks of the Paraguay River. At the time, the ship was part of the fleet formed by the battleships Bahia, Barroso, Colombo (its sister ship), Herval, Mariz e Barros, Silvado and Tamandaré, in addition to the corvettes Parnaíba and Beberibe, the gunboat Forte de Coimbra and two armed barges, under the command of Vice Admiral Joaquim José Inácio.

This fleet bombed the fortress together with the battery from the Curuzú fortress, already taken by the Brazilians, with the soldiers of the 48th Battalion of Fatherland Volunteers and with the fleet of chief Elisiário dos Santos, which included the Araguari and Iguatemi gunboats, the steamer Lindóia, the bomber Pedro Afonso, the barge Mercedes and the launch João das Botas. A total of 874 bombs were fired at the fort, killing many Paraguayans and seriously injuring its commander, general Díaz. The Brazilian side claimed about 14 casualties, including the death of the Silvado commander. Also on February 2nd, command of Cabral was transferred to first lieutenant Jerônimo Francisco Gonçalves.

The Imperial Navy aimed to force the passage of this fortress, but considered the feat practically impossible. Curupayty was a set of fortifications and trenches that formed part of the defensive complex of Humaitá. It had 35 artillery pieces pointed to the river, and included the 80-caliber cannon El Cristiano, one of the largest made in the 19th century. Still, the navy chose to force the passage, choosing the 15th of August for the action. Before that, however, the fortress would be bombed on 29 May and 5 August.

At 6:40 am on August 15, Cabral forced the passage of Curupayty, forming part of the so-called Alvim Division, commanded by Francisco Cordeiro Torres e Alvim, and towing the barge Riachuelo. (Note: Another source claims the Cabral was towing the barge Cuevas.) According to a Brazilian historian:

"Curupayty resisted with all the powers of despair, filling the air with a hideous roar, and not being able to hold back with strings of bullets the gallant ships that followed their destiny. Not even the projectiles of the rifles [they] saw fit to dispense with. The ships were fired back at with huge bombs and shallow 68 bullets, which made a dent, but few of which actually did damage".

The ships Cabral, Brasil, the monitor Lima Barros and seven other battleships from the fleet that had bombed the fortress on 2 February took about two hours to complete the crossing.

=== Attack of the Paraguayan canoes ===
At dawn between the 1 and 2 March 1868, the battleships Lima Barros and Cabral were anchored between Humaitá and Curupayty, along with others who accompanied them in the passage of the latter. For six months, the ships remained in this position, carrying out actions against the fortress of Humaitá and supporting the monitors who forced the passage of the fort on February 19th. The distance from the fortification allowed the ships to be protected from their guns, but three pieces of Paraguayan artillery, installed in a wood close to the battleships, often attacked them. About 500 meters ahead of the ships, at 2 am, a longboat commanded by the midshipman José Roque da Silva was patrolling the region. Roque da Silva noticed an unusual movement of water hyacinths descending the river and, as he approached, he saw that they were in fact Paraguayan canoes full of armed men. Roque da Silva immediately headed towards the fleet and warned it of the enemy approach. Herval launched three rockets, raising the alarm.

The Paraguayan fleet consisted of 24 canoes, with 12 men in each one, grouped into four divisions under the command of captain Yunez. The assailants were armed with sabers, pistols, axes and machetes, as well as hand grenades and rockets that they planned to launch inside the ships. Due to the strong current, some canoes were unable to board the ships and were washed downstream and captured by other imperial ships. Out of the 24 canoes, 14 boarded Lima Barros and eight surrounded Cabral, while the rest were pushed downstream. The attackers boarded the two vessels with "savage fury", causing the sentries and personnel there to scramble as best they could to stop them. The garrisons had to take shelter inside the vessels to protect themselves. The division's commander, chief Joaquim Rodrigues da Costa, and the ship's commander, Garcindo de Sá, went out onto the deck of Lima Barros to conduct the fighting, but Rodrigues da Costa was surrounded by the Paraguayans, who attacked him repeatedly. Even though Rodrigues da Costa was down and seriously wounded, he still ordered the Lima Barros to fire at the Paraguayans, an order he repeated until his last breath.

In order to carry out the order of his superior, commander Garcindo de Sá, who had managed to enter the Lima Barros through one of its portholes, fired at the Paraguayans, decimating them, but unable to make them retreat. On the contrary, the Paraguayans began to attack with redoubled fury, desperately trying to open ruptures in the ship with axes to launch their hand grenades. The same happened on the battleship Cabral, whose garrison fought with the same determination. Despite the efforts of Cabral's men, the Paraguayans managed to penetrate it and were about to take the ship when the battleships Silvado and Herval approached, strafing and sweeping the Paraguayans from the deck and thus saving them. The battle resulted in the death of 110 Paraguayans. There were 16 deaths, 55 wounded and 15 prisoners among the Brazilians.

=== Actions in Humaitá ===
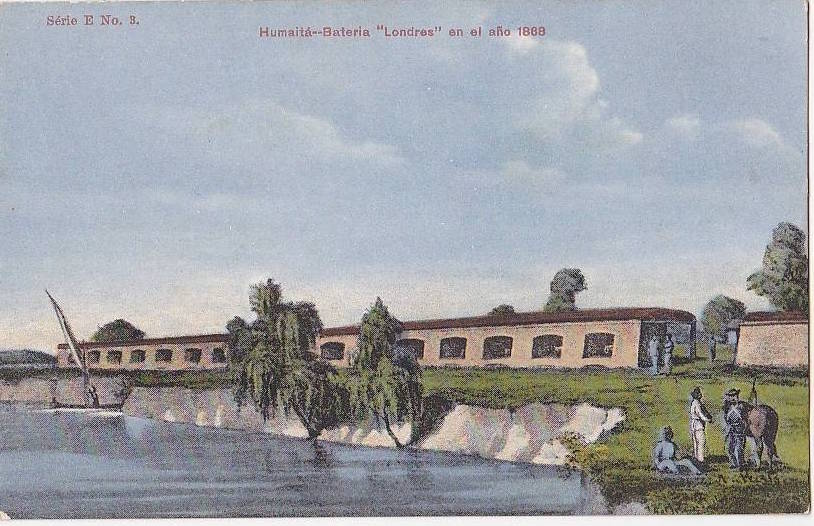
Londres battery of the Humaitá fortress

On April 10, Cabral and the fleet of its division (Alvim) began a long bombardment of the fortress of Humaitá, in preparation for the attack by the Allied army under the command of the general Marquis of Caxias, which took place on July 16. The allied naval high command decided once again to dash past Humaitá with the aim of strengthen the position of the ships that had already did so on February 19 and to increase the naval force that would act in the region of Tebicuary, where the existence of another Paraguayan fortification was already known. Three battleships, Cabral, Silvado and Piauí, were assigned for this passage. Two others would act in their protection, Lima Barros and Brasil. Despite the fact Cabral had been chosen, it was not vice admiral Viscount of Inhaúma's first choice. Herval had been the admiral's first choice for having a smaller draft, that is, for being better suited for river navigation, but Cabral was known to be "poorly maneuverable", as he explained.

The transposition began at 4:00 AM on 21 July 1868, when Cabral, which was in the lead, began to move, starting at 4:15 AM. When the battleship began to sail, after lifting its anchor, it turned sharply towards Lima Barros, which was still at anchor, causing a violent collision between the two vessels, with the loss of two longboats and a canoe, all of them from Cabral. After the crew managed to straighten the ship, it headed for the crossing, to face the fortress' cannons and the chains that crossed the river, on both sides, with the objective of stopping the fleet's advance. At that moment, Cabral swerved again sharply and collided with Silvado, which was following it on the starboard side. This collision broke the cables that connected Piauí to Silvado and prevented the fleet from carrying out the transposition, requiring repairs to both ships. Two officers from Piauí came out of the ship's interior and managed to repair the cables, even under artillery fire from the fort.

It is probable the battleships Silvado and Piauí overtook Cabral, after the second collision, and completed the passage first, as Silvado's onboard log reports that the vessel finished the crossing at 4:40 am, after which three rockets that signaled the success were launched. Cabral's crew managed to maneuver the ship in such a way as to force the passage, which, according to their records, took place at 4:48 am. After the pass, at around 6:24 am, the ships anchored next to the Araçá island. The greatest damage was due to the collisions caused by Cabral, as there were no casualties among the crew of the vessels. Cabral reported having received a bullet impact, which punctured the iron armor and broke the coaming of the frontal gunport. Piauí claimed only superficial damage to the armor, and Silvado reported greater damage, such as the "rupture of the steam tube, caused by a bullet; four pierced the chimney, one in the aft turret that collapsed the plate, one on the starboard side, which also collapsed the plate, and one on the port side that left a one inch depression".

=== Passage of Timbó ===
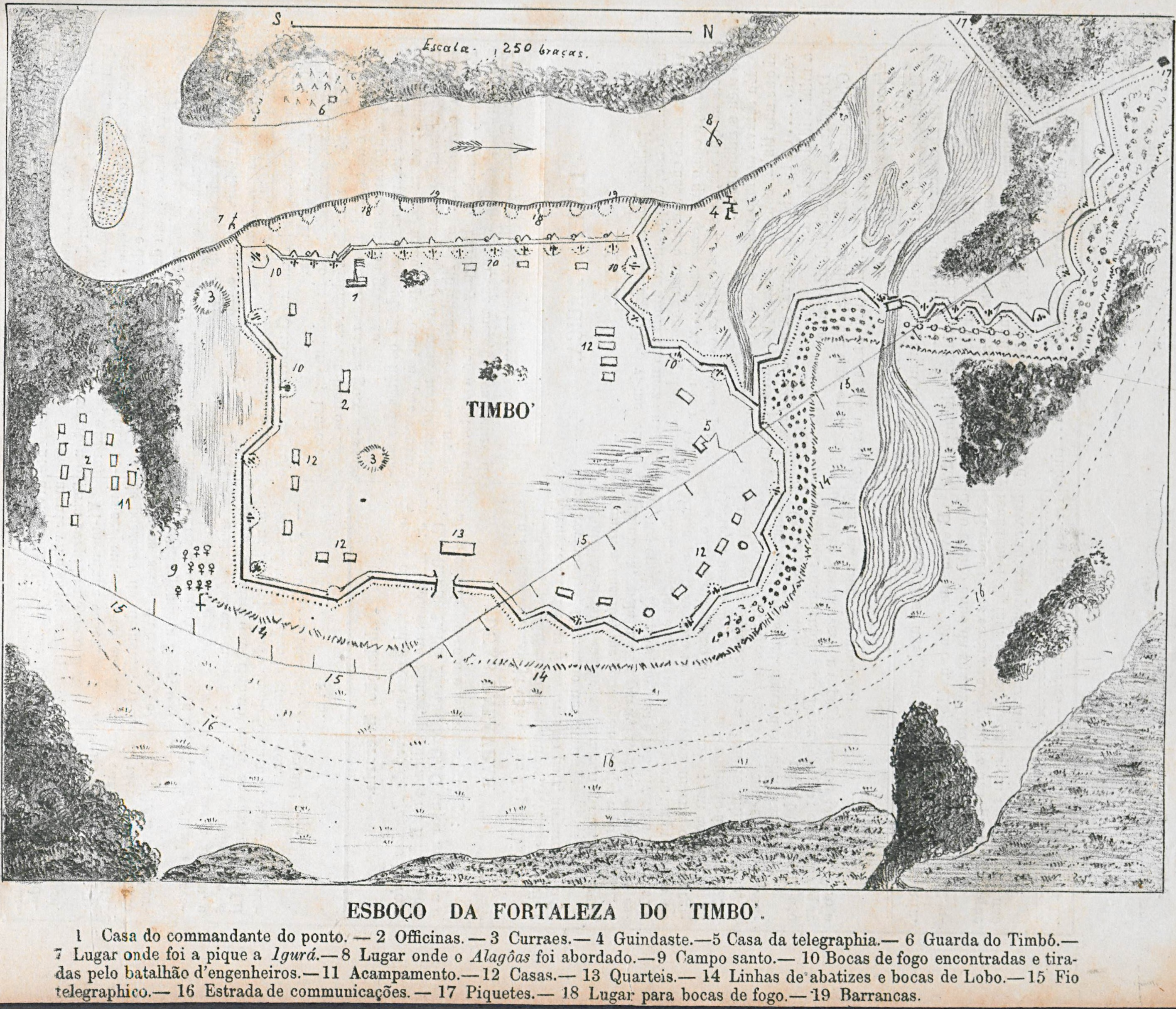
Scheme of the Timbó fortress (Semana Illustrada, 1867)

Still on 21 July, the squadron left from Araçá island and headed towards a position of Paraguayan batteries below the Arroio Guaicuru, which constantly threatened army troops stationed in the Chaco. Cabral and its squadron's ships bombarded this battery for a while. On the same day, the squadron, made up of the battleships Bahia and Silvado and the monitors Alagoas and Piauí, under the command of chief Delfim Carlos de Carvalho, was ordered to position itself near the Timbó fort. In doing so, the bombardment of that position began until the evening of that day. That night, the battleships and monitors challenged Timbó's batteries, positioned so that they could efficiently hit a wide stretch of the river, and successfully dashed past the fortress.

On 16 August, Cabral, Brasil and Tamandaré, a squadron under the command of the Viscount of Inhaúma, left from Humaitá and received orders to also force the passage of Timbó. The transposition took place with the battleships advancing moored to three other steam transports, and it was equally successful. After passing through, the squadron anchored in front of Pilar.

=== Passage of Angostura ===
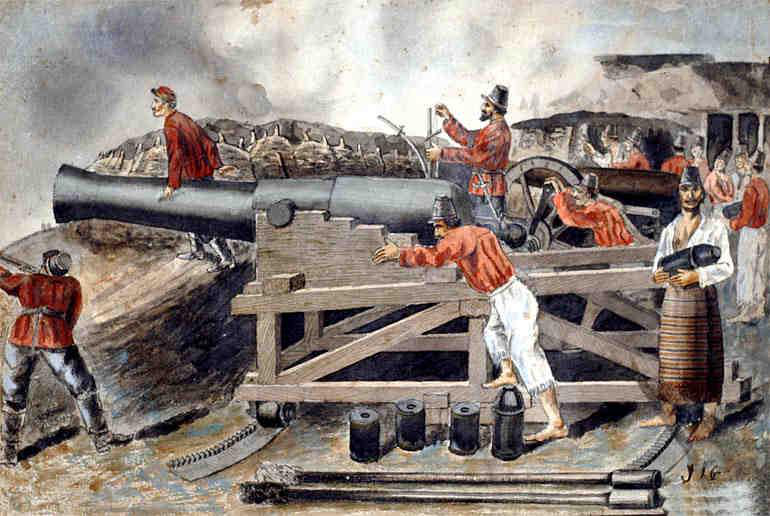
Drawing showing British commander Thompson in a battery in the Angostura fortress (José Garmendia, 1890)

During October 1868, the battleships Tamandaré, Bahia, Silvado, Barroso, Colombo, Brazil, Alagoas, Lima Barros and Rio Grande do Norte, in that order, forced the passage of Angostura, a fortress on the Paraguay River heavily defended by batteries. On the 28th, Cabral and Piauí began a long and heavy bombardment on the Paraguayan batteries defending the fort. On 19 November, the fort was again violently bombarded by the same squadron, with the support of Herval and Mariz e Barros, with captain Mamede Simões directing the action.

A week later, Brasil, Cabral, Piauí and the steamer Triunfo received orders to cross the Angostura fortress. At that time, the fort was commanded by British engineer George Thompson. In passing, the fleet was met with strong opposition, with Cabral reporting 37 impacts and two officers wounded. Despite the difficulty, the transposition was carried out successfully and the squadron headed to meet the other vessels anchored above the fort, in Villeta. Angostura would continue to be bombarded throughout December, until its complete surrender on the 30th.

=== Last years ===
After the conquest of Asunción, on 1 January 1869, the already worn out large battleships, such as Cabral, were no longer as useful in the conflict, with naval combats taking place, from then on, in small, very narrow streams. Only Tamandaré and the six Pará-class monitors remained in Asunción. The others were recalled to Rio de Janeiro, where they underwent major repair works. In 1870, the imperial naval command began to distribute the battleships to the various naval districts for the defense of ports in Brazil.

In the first district, which ran from the extreme south of the country to the border between the provinces of Rio de Janeiro and Espírito Santo, the battleships Brasil, Lima Barros, Silvado and Bahia were allocated. In the second, which went from the limits district to the city of Mossoró, in the province of Rio Grande do Norte, Herval and Mariz de Barros were anchored. Finally, in mid-1873, Cabral and its sister ship, Colombo, were assigned to the third district, which stretched from Mossoró to French Guiana.

In June 1875, Cabral was anchored in Bahia. By report of 16 January 1877, Cabral was fully armed. On 24 July 1878, the imperial navy issued an unfavorable opinion to the request of Cabral's officers to include the time of service they provided on board the ship when it was designated as a river battery, since 12 May 1876, due to bad navigation conditions. The command of the second naval district communicated, on 9 November 1882, that on the 8th, Cabral had been disarmed and its hull had been handed over to the Bahia Arsenal, thus ending its activities.
