= Brazilian monitor Alagoas =

Imperial Brazilian Navy's Pará-class river monitors

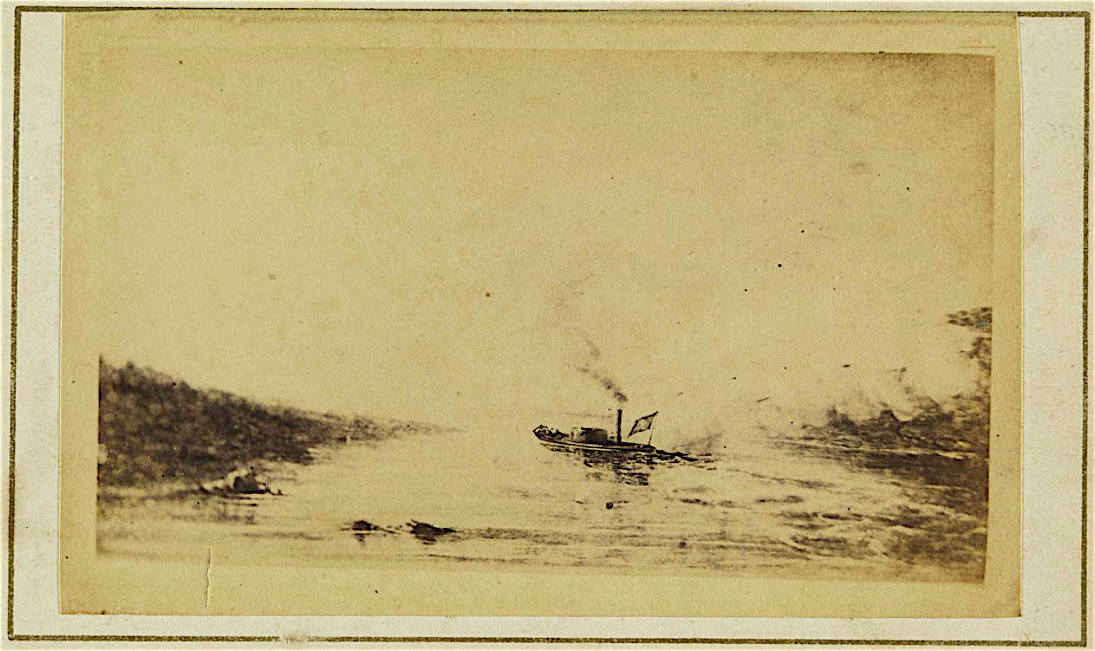
- A photo of Alagoas near Humaitá, River Paraguay, 1868. (National Library of Brazil.)

History

Empire of Brazil
- Name: Alagoas
- Namesake: Alagoas
- Ordered: 1866
- Builder: Arsenal de Marinha da Corte, Rio de Janeiro
- Laid down: 8 December 1866
- Launched: 29 October 1867
- Completed: November 1867
- Fate: Scrapped 1900

General characteristics
- Class & type: Pará-class monitor
- Displacement: 500 metric tons (490 long tons)
- Length: 39 m (127 ft 11 in)
- Beam: 8.54 m (28 ft 0 in)
- Draft: 1.51–1.54 m (5.0–5.1 ft) (mean)
- Installed power: 180 ihp (130 kW)
- Propulsion: 2 shafts, 2 steam engines, 2 boilers
- Speed: 8 knots (15 km/h; 9.2 mph)
- Complement: 8 officers and 35 men
- Armament: 1 × 70-pounder Whitworth gun
- Armor: Belt: 51–102 mm (2.0–4.0 in); Gun turret: 76–152 mm (3.0–6.0 in); Deck: 12.7 mm (0.50 in)

The Brazilian monitor Alagoas was the third ship of the Pará-class river monitors built for the Imperial Brazilian Navy during the Paraguayan War in the late 1860s. Alagoas participated in the Passage of Humaitá on 19 February 1868 and provided fire support for the army for the rest of the war. The ship was assigned to the Upper Uruguay (Portuguese: Alto Uruguai) flotilla after the war. Alagoas was transferred to Rio de Janeiro in the 1890s and participated in the Navy Revolt of 1893–94. The ship was scrapped in 1900.

== Design and description ==
The Pará-class monitors were designed to meet the need of the Brazilian Navy for small, shallow-draft armored ships capable of withstanding heavy fire. The monitor configuration was chosen as a turreted design did not have the same problems engaging enemy ships and fortifications as did the casemate ironclads already in Brazilian service. The oblong gun turret sat on a circular platform that had a central pivot. It was rotated by four men via a system of gears; 2.25 minutes were required for a full 360° rotation. A bronze ram was fitted to these ships as well. The hull was sheathed with Muntz metal to reduce biofouling.

The ships measured 39 meters (127 ft 11 in) long overall, with a beam of 8.54 meters (28 ft 0 in). They had a draft between of 1.51–1.54 meters (4 ft 11 in – 5 ft 1 in) and displaced 500 metric tons (490 long tons). With only 0.3 meters (1 ft 0 in) of freeboard they had to be towed between Rio de Janeiro and their area of operations. Their crew numbered 43 officers and men.

=== Propulsion ===
The Pará-class ships had two direct-acting steam engines, each driving a single 1.3-meter (4 ft 3 in) propeller. Their engines were powered by two tubular boilers at a working pressure of 59 psi (407 kPa; 4 kgf/cm^{2}). The engines produced a total of 180 indicated horsepower (130 kW) which gave the monitors a maximum speed of 8 knots (15 km/h; 9.2 mph) in calm waters. The ships carried enough coal for one day's steaming.

=== Armament ===
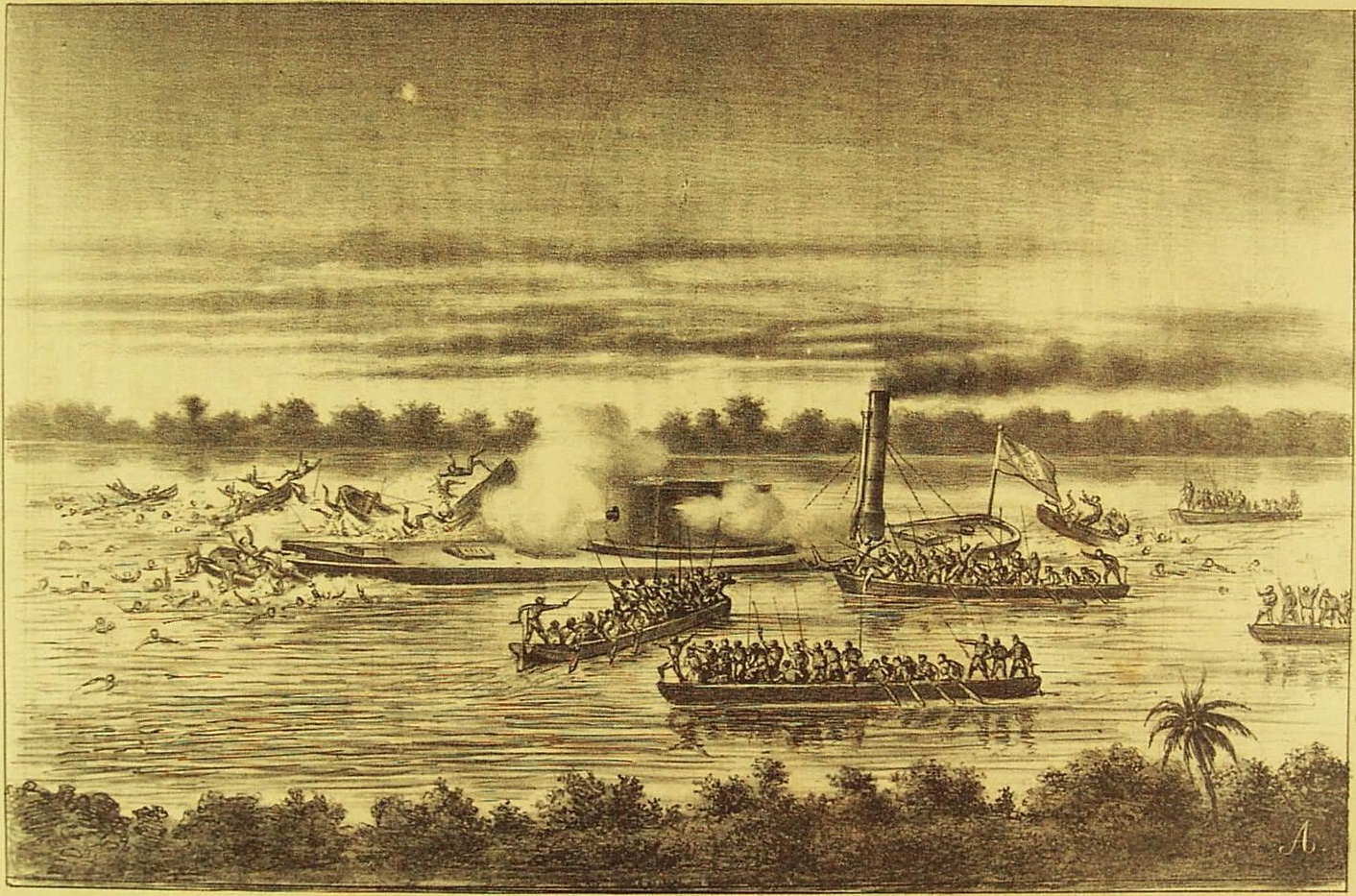
Paraguayan canoes approaching Alagoas, in the vicinity of Timbó batteries.

Alagoas carried a single 70-pounder Whitworth rifled muzzle loader (RML) in her gun turret. The 70-pounder gun had a maximum elevation of 15°. It had a maximum range of 5,540 meters (6,060 yd). The 70-pounder gun weighed 8,582 pounds (3,892.7 kg) and fired a 5.5-inch (140 mm) shell that weighed 81 pounds (36.7 kg). Most unusually the gun's Brazilian-designed iron carriage was designed to pivot vertically at the muzzle; this was done to minimize the size of the gunport through which splinters and shells could enter.

=== Armor ===
The hull of the Pará-class ships was made from three layers of wood that alternated in orientation. It was 457 millimeters (18.0 in) thick and was capped with a 102-millimeter (4 in) layer of peroba hardwood. The ships had a complete wrought iron waterline belt, 0.91 meters (3.0 ft) high. It had a maximum thickness of 102 millimeters amidships, decreasing to 76 millimeters (3 in) and 51 millimeters (2 in) at the ship's ends. The curved deck was armored with 12.7 millimeters (0.5 in) of wrought iron.

The gun turret was shaped like a rectangle with rounded corners. It was built much like the hull, but the front of the turret was protected by 152 millimeters (6 in) of armor, the sides by 102 millimeters and the rear by 76 millimeters. Its roof and the exposed portions of the platform it rested upon were protected by 12.7 millimeters of armor. The armored pilothouse was positioned ahead of the turret.

== Service ==
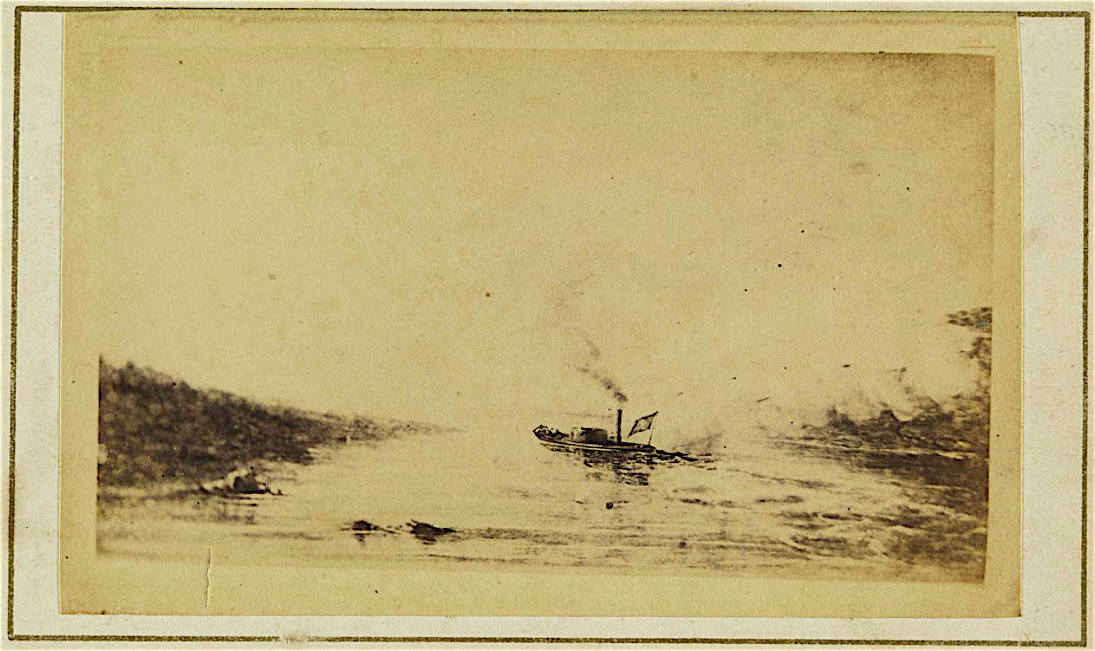
A rare photograph of the Brazilian river monitor Alagoas near Humaitá. Note the low profile presented to enemy artillery. (From a soldier's photographic album.)

Alagoas was laid down at the Arsenal de Marinha da Corte in Rio de Janeiro on 8 December 1866, during the Paraguayan War, which saw Argentina, Uruguay and the Empire of Brazil allied against Paraguay. She was launched on 29 October 1867 and completed in November 1867. She arrived on the Paraná River in January 1868, although her passage further north was barred by the Paraguayan fortifications at Humaitá. On 19 February 1868, six Brazilian ironclads, including Alagoas, steamed past Humaitá at night. Alagoas and her two sister ships, Rio Grande and Pará were lashed to the larger ironclads in case any engines were disabled by the Paraguayan guns. Barroso led with Rio Grande, followed by Bahia with Alagoas and Tamandaré with Pará.

The cable tying Alagoas to Bahia was severed by Paraguayan shells and the monitor drifted down below the guns. The commander of the Alagoas was ordered not to attempt to pass the guns during daylight, but disregarded this order and successfully rendezvoused with the rest of the squadron upstream of the fortifications. Both Alagoas, which had taken an estimated 200 hits, and Pará had to be beached after passing the fortress to prevent them from sinking. Alagoas was under repair at São José do Cerrito until mid-March. Accompanied by Tamandaré, Alagoas bombarded and destroyed the Paraguayan artillery battery at Timbó, upstream of Humaitá, on 23 March. The monitor bombarded artillery positions defending the Tebicuary River in July and again in August.

On 15 October she bombarded Angostura Fort, south of Asunción, in company with Brasil, Silvado, Pará and her sister Ceará.

After the war Alagoas was assigned to the newly formed Alto Uruguay Flotilla, based at Itaqui. In the 1880s the ship's armament was reinforced with a pair of 11-millimeter (0.43 in) machine guns. Alagoas was transferred to Rio de Janeiro in the 1890s and joined the rebels in the Navy Revolt of 1893–94. Her engines had been removed by this point and she had to be towed into position to fire on the government forts. She was scrapped in 1900.

== See also ==
The article Passage of Humaitá contains contemporaneous descriptions of Alagoas and her sister monitors by captain Richard Burton and colonel George Thompson.
