= Alagoas (disambiguation) =

Alagoas is a state of Brazil. Alagoas may also refer to:

- Alagoas Province, a former province of Brazil
- Brazilian monitor Alagoas, a ship
