= Brazilian monitor Santa Catharina =

Imperial Brazilian Navy's Pará-class river monitors

History

Empire of Brazil
- Name: Santa Catharina
- Namesake: Santa Catarina
- Ordered: 1866
- Builder: Arsenal de Marinha da Côrte, Rio de Janeiro
- Laid down: 8 December 1866
- Launched: 5 May 1868
- Completed: June 1868
- Fate: Sank 1882

General characteristics
- Class & type: Pará-class monitor
- Displacement: 500 metric tons (490 long tons)
- Length: 39 m (127 ft 11 in)
- Beam: 8.54 m (28 ft 0 in)
- Draft: 1.51–1.54 meters (4 ft 11 in – 5 ft 1 in) (mean)
- Installed power: 180 ihp (130 kW)
- Propulsion: 2 shafts, 2 steam engines, 2 boilers
- Speed: 8 knots (15 km/h; 9.2 mph)
- Complement: 8 officers and 35 men
- Armament: 1 × 120-pounder Whitworth gun
- Armor: Belt: 51–102 mm (2.0–4.0 in); Gun turret: 76–152 mm (3.0–6.0 in); Deck: 12.7 mm (0.50 in)

The Brazilian monitor Santa Catharina (in modern spelling, Santa Catarina) was the sixth, and last, ship of the Pará-class river monitors built for the Brazilian Navy during the Paraguayan War in the late 1860s. By the time she was completed the war was winding down and she only had one significant engagement against Paraguayan forces in 1869. The ship was assigned to the Mato Grosso Flotilla after the war. Santa Catharina sank at her moorings while under repair in 1882.

== Design and description ==
The Pará-class monitors were designed to meet the need of the Brazilian Navy for small, shallow-draft armored ships capable of withstanding heavy fire. The monitor configuration was chosen as a turreted design did not have the same problems engaging enemy ships and fortifications as did the central battery ironclads already in Brazilian service. The oblong gun turret sat on a circular platform that had a central pivot. It was rotated by four men via a system of gears; 2.25 minutes were required for a full 360° rotation. A bronze ram was fitted to these ships as well. The hull was sheathed with Muntz metal to reduce biofouling.

The ships measured 39 meters (127 ft 11 in) long overall, with a beam of 8.54 meters (28 ft 0 in). They had a draft between of 1.51–1.54 meters (4 ft 11 in – 5 ft 1 in) and displaced 500 metric tons (490 long tons). With only 0.3 meters (1 ft 0 in) of freeboard they had to be towed between Rio de Janeiro and their area of operations. Their crew numbered 43 officers and men.

=== Propulsion ===
The Pará-class ships had two direct-acting steam engines, each driving a single 1.3-meter (4 ft 3 in) propeller. Their engines were powered by two tubular boilers at a working pressure of 59 psi (407 kPa; 4 kgf/cm^{2}). The engines produced a total of 180 indicated horsepower (130 kW) which gave the monitors a maximum speed of 8 knots (15 km/h; 9.2 mph) in calm waters. The ships carried enough coal for one day's steaming.

=== Armament ===
Santa Catharina had a single 120-pounder Whitworth rifled muzzle loader (RML) in her gun turret. The gun had a maximum range of about 5,540 meters (6,060 yd). The 7-inch (178 mm) shell of the 120-pounder gun weighed 151 pounds (68.5 kg) while the gun itself weighed 16,660 pounds (7,556.8 kg). Most unusually the guns' Brazilian-designed iron carriage was designed to pivot vertically at the muzzle; this was done to minimize the size of the gunport through which splinters and shells could enter.

=== Armor ===
The hull of the Pará-class ships was made from three layers of wood that alternated in orientation. It was 457 millimeters (18.0 in) thick and was capped with a 102-millimeter (4 in) layer of peroba hardwood. The ships had a complete wrought iron waterline belt, 0.91 meters (3.0 ft) high. It had a maximum thickness of 102 millimeters amidships, decreasing to 76 millimeters (3 in) and 51 millimeters (2 in) at the ship's ends. The curved deck was armored with 12.7 millimeters (0.5 in) of wrought iron.

The gun turret was shaped like a rectangle with rounded corners. It was built much like the hull, but the front of the turret was protected by 152 millimeters (6 in) of armor, the sides by 102 millimeters and the rear by 76 millimeters. Its roof and the exposed portions of the platform it rested upon were protected by 12.7 millimeters of armor. The armored pilothouse was positioned ahead of the turret.

== Service ==
Santa Catharina was laid down at the Arsenal de Marinha da Côrte in Rio de Janeiro on 8 December 1866, during the Paraguayan War, which saw Argentina and Brazil allied against Paraguay. She was launched on 5 May 1868 and commissioned the next month. She reached Paraguay in mid-1868, when the war was winding down. Santa Catharina, together with her sister ships Ceará and Piauí, broke through the Paraguayan defenses at Guaraio on 29 April 1869 and drove off the defenders. The monitor provided fire support to the army for the rest of the war. After the war she was assigned to the Mato Grosso Flotilla. While docked for repairs in 1882, Santa Catharina sank at her moorings due to the poor condition of her hull. Her ultimate fate is unknown.
