= Pará-class monitor =

Imperial Brazilian Navy's Pará-class of wooden-hulled ironclad monitors

- A photo of Alagoas, possibly in Rio de Janeiro in the 1890s

Class overview
- Name: Pará class
- Builders: Arsenal de Marinha da Côrte, Rio de Janeiro
- Operators: Imperial Brazilian Navy
- Preceded by: Silvado
- Succeeded by: Javary class
- Built: 1866–1868
- In service: 1867–1900
- Completed: 6
- Scrapped: 6

General characteristics
- Type: River monitor
- Displacement: 500 metric tons (490 long tons)
- Length: 39 m (127 ft 11 in)
- Beam: 8.54 m (28 ft 0 in)
- Draft: 1.51–1.54 m (5.0–5.1 ft) (mean)
- Installed power: 180 ihp (130 kW)
- Propulsion: 2 shafts, 2 steam engines, 2 boilers
- Speed: 8 knots (15 km/h; 9.2 mph)
- Complement: 8 officers and 35 men
- Armament: 1 × 70- or 120-pdr Whitworth gun
- Armor: Belt: 51–102 mm (2.0–4.0 in); Gun turret: 76–152 mm (3.0–6.0 in); Deck: 12.7 mm (0.50 in)

The Pará-class monitors were a group of six wooden-hulled ironclad monitors named after Brazilian provinces and built in Brazil for the Imperial Brazilian Navy during the Paraguayan War in the late 1860s. The first three ships finished, Pará, Alagoas and Rio Grande, participated in the Passage of Humaitá in February 1868. Afterwards the remaining ships joined the first three and they all provided fire support for the army for the rest of the war. The ships were split between the newly formed Upper Uruguay (Portuguese: Alto Uruguai) and Mato Grosso Flotillas after the war. Alagoas was transferred to Rio de Janeiro in the 1890s and participated in the Fleet Revolt of 1893–94.

== Design and description ==
The Pará-class river monitors were designed to meet the need of the Brazilian Navy for small, shallow-draft armored ships capable of withstanding heavy fire during the Paraguayan War, which saw Argentina and Brazil allied against Paraguay. The two foreign-built river monitors already in service drew enough water that they could not operate on the shallower rivers in Paraguay. The monitor configuration was chosen as a turreted design did not have the same problems engaging enemy ships and fortifications as did the casemate ironclads already in Brazilian service. The oblong gun turret sat on a circular platform that had a central pivot. It was rotated by four men via a system of gears; 2.25 minutes were required for a full 360° rotation. A bronze ram was fitted to these ships as well. The hull was sheathed with Muntz metal to reduce biofouling.

The ships measured 39 meters (127 ft 11 in) long overall, with a beam of 8.54 meters (28 ft 0 in). They had a draft between of 1.51–1.54 meters (4 ft 11 in – 5 ft 1 in) and displaced 500 metric tons (490 long tons). With only 0.3 meters (1 ft 0 in) of freeboard they had to be towed between Rio de Janeiro and their area of operations. Their crew numbered 43 officers and men.

=== Propulsion ===
The Pará-class ships had two direct-acting steam engines, each driving a single 1.3-meter (4 ft 3 in) propeller. Their engines were powered by two tubular boilers at a working pressure of 59 psi (407 kPa; 4 kgf/cm^{2}). The engines produced a total of 180 indicated horsepower (130 kW) which gave the monitors a maximum speed of 8 knots (15 km/h; 9.2 mph) in calm waters. The ships carried enough coal for one day's steaming.

=== Armament ===
The first three ships carried a single 70-pounder Whitworth rifled muzzle loader (RML) in their gun turret, but the last three ships substituted a 120-pounder Whitworth RML. The 70-pdr gun had a maximum elevation of 15°, but the larger gun's elevation was reduced because of its longer barrel. Both guns had a similar maximum range of 5,540 meters (6,060 yd). The 70-pdr gun weighed 8,582 pounds (3,892.7 kg) and fired a 5.5-inch (140 mm) shell that weighed 81 pounds (36.7 kg). The 7-inch (178 mm) shell of the 120-pdr gun weighed 151 pounds (68.5 kg) while the gun itself weighed 16,660 pounds (7,556.8 kg). Most unusually the guns' Brazilian-designed iron carriage was designed to pivot vertically at the muzzle; this was done to minimize the size of the gunport through which splinters and shells could enter.

=== Armor ===
The hull of the Pará-class ships was made from three layers of wood that alternated in orientation. It was 457 millimeters (18.0 in) thick and was capped with a 102-millimeter (4 in) layer of peroba hardwood. The ships had a complete wrought iron waterline belt, 0.91 meters (3.0 ft) high. It had a maximum thickness of 102 millimeters amidships, decreasing to 76 millimeters (3 in) and 51 millimeters (2 in) at the ship's ends. The curved deck was armored with 12.7 millimeters (0.5 in) of wrought iron.

The gun turret was shaped like a rectangle with rounded corners. It was built much like the hull, but the front of the turret was protected by 152 millimeters (6 in) of armor, the sides by 102 millimeters and the rear by 76 millimeters. Its roof and the exposed portions of the platform it rested upon were protected by 12.7 millimeters of armor. The armored pilothouse was positioned ahead of the turret.

== Construction ==
Construction data
Ship	Builder	Laid down	Launched	Completed	Fate
Pará	Arsenal de Marinha da Côrte, Rio de Janeiro	8 December 1866	21 May 1867	15 June 1867	Discarded, 1884 at Ladário
Rio Grande	Arsenal de Marinha da Côrte, Rio de Janeiro	8 December 1866	17 August 1867	3 September 1867	Scrapped, February 1907
Alagoas	Arsenal de Marinha da Côrte, Rio de Janeiro	8 December 1866	29 October 1867	November 1867	Scrapped, 1900
Piauí	Arsenal de Marinha da Côrte, Rio de Janeiro	8 December 1866	8 January 1868	January 1868	Scrapped, 1893
Ceará	Arsenal de Marinha da Côrte, Rio de Janeiro	8 December 1866	22 March 1868	April 1868	Scrapped, 1884
Santa Catharina	Arsenal de Marinha da Côrte, Rio de Janeiro	8 December 1866	5 May 1868	June 1868	Sank, 1882

== Service history ==
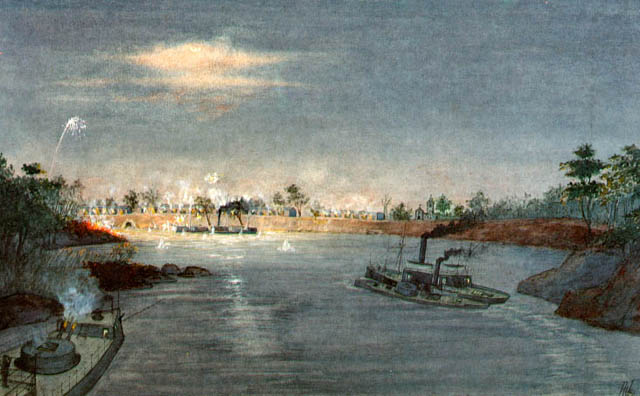
A painting of the Passagem showing a Pará-class monitor lashed to one of the bigger ironclads

The first three ships finished, Pará, Alagoas and Rio Grande, participated in the Passage of Humaitá on 19 February 1868. For the engagement the three river monitors were lashed to the larger ironclads in case any engines were disabled by the Paraguayan guns. Barroso led with Rio Grande, followed by Bahia with Alagoas and Tamandaré with Pará. Both Alagoas, which had taken an estimated 200 hits, and Pará had to be beached after passing the fortress to prevent them from sinking. Alagoas was under repair at São José do Cerrito until mid-March, although Pará joined a squadron to capture the town of Laureles on 27 February. Rio Grande continued upstream with the other undamaged ships and they bombarded Asunción on 24 February with little effect. On 23 March Rio Grande and Barroso sank the Paraguayan steamer Igurey and both ships were boarded by Paraguayan soldiers on the evening of 9 July, although they managed to repel the boarders.

For the rest of the war the river monitors bombarded Paraguayan positions and artillery batteries in support of the army, notably at Angostura, Timbó and along the Tebicuary and Manduvirá Rivers. After the war the ships were divided between the newly formed Upper Uruguay and Mato Grosso Flotillas. Alagoas was transferred to Rio de Janeiro in the 1890s and participated in the Fleet Revolt of 1893–1894. The ships were disposed of during the last two decades of the 19th century, although Rio Grande was docked for reconstruction in 1899. The work was never completed and she was eventually scrapped in 1907.

== See also ==
- List of ironclads
- List of historical ships of the Brazilian Navy
