= Brazilian monitor Piauí =

Imperial Brazilian Navy's Pará-class river monitors

History

Empire of Brazil
- Name: Piauí
- Namesake: Piauí
- Ordered: 1866
- Builder: Arsenal de Marinha da Côrte, Rio de Janeiro
- Laid down: 8 December 1866
- Launched: 8 January 1868
- Completed: January 1868
- Fate: Scrapped 1893

General characteristics
- Class & type: Pará-class monitor
- Displacement: 500 metric tons (490 long tons)
- Length: 39 m (127 ft 11 in)
- Beam: 8.54 m (28 ft 0 in)
- Draft: 1.51–1.54 m (5.0–5.1 ft) (mean)
- Installed power: 180 ihp (130 kW)
- Propulsion: 2 shafts, 2 steam engines, 2 boilers
- Speed: 8 knots (15 km/h; 9.2 mph)
- Complement: 8 officers and 35 men
- Armament: 1 × 120-pounder Whitworth gun
- Armor: Belt: 51–102 mm (2.0–4.0 in); Gun turret: 76–152 mm (3.0–6.0 in); Deck: 12.7 mm (0.50 in)

The Brazilian monitor Piauí was the fourth ship of the Pará-class river monitors built for the Brazilian Navy during the Paraguayan War in the late 1860s. Piauí passed the fortifications at Humaitá in July 1868 and provided fire support for the army for the rest of the war. The ship was assigned to the Mato Grosso Flotilla after the war. Piauí was scrapped in 1893.

== Design and description ==
The Pará-class monitors were designed to meet the need of the Brazilian Navy for small, shallow-draft armored ships capable of withstanding heavy fire. The monitor configuration was chosen since a turreted design did not have the same problems engaging enemy ships and fortifications as did the central battery ironclads already in Brazilian service. The oblong gun turret sat on a circular platform that had a central pivot. It was rotated by four men via a system of gears; 2.25 minutes were required for a full 360° rotation. A bronze ram was fitted to these ships as well. The hull was sheathed with Muntz metal to reduce biofouling.

The ships measured 39 meters (127 ft 11 in) long overall, with a beam of 8.54 meters (28 ft 0 in). They had a draft of 1.51 to 1.54 meters (4 ft 11 in to 5 ft 1 in) and displaced 500 metric tons (490 long tons). With only 0.3 meters (1 ft 0 in) of freeboard they had to be towed between Rio de Janeiro and their areas of operations. Their crew numbered 43 officers and men.

=== Propulsion ===
The Pará-class ships had two direct-acting steam engines, each driving a single 1.3-meter (4 ft 3 in) propeller. Their engines were powered by two tubular boilers at a working pressure of 59 psi (407 kPa; 4 kgf/cm^{2}). The engines produced a total of 180 indicated horsepower (130 kW) which gave the monitors a maximum speed of 8 knots (15 km/h; 9.2 mph) in calm waters. The ships carried enough coal for one day's steaming.

=== Armament ===
Piauí had a single 120-pounder Whitworth rifled muzzle loader (RML) in her gun turret. The gun had a maximum range of about 5,540 meters (6,060 yd). Its 7-inch (178 mm) shells weighed 151 pounds (68.5 kg) and the gun itself weighed 16,660 pounds (7,556.8 kg). Most unusually the gun's Brazilian-designed iron carriage was designed to pivot vertically at the muzzle; this was done to minimize the size of the gunport through which splinters and shells could enter.

=== Armor ===
The hull of the Pará-class ships was made from three layers of wood, with the grain of each layer at right angles to the next layer. It was 457 millimeters (18.0 in) thick and was capped with a 102-millimeter (4 in) layer of peroba hardwood. The ships had a complete wrought iron waterline belt, 0.91 meters (3.0 ft) high. It had a maximum thickness of 102 millimeters amidships, decreasing to 76 millimeters (3 in) and 51 millimeters (2 in) at the ship's ends. The curved deck was armored with 12.7 millimeters (0.5 in) of wrought iron.

The rectangular gun turret had rounded corners. It was built much like the hull, but the front of the turret was protected by 152 millimeters (6 in) of armor, the sides by 102 millimeters and the rear by 76 millimeters. Its roof and the exposed portions of the platform it rested upon were protected by 12.7 millimeters of armor. The armored pilothouse was positioned ahead of the turret.

== Service ==
Piauí was laid down at the Arsenal de Marinha da Côrte in Rio de Janeiro on 8 December 1866, during the Paraguayan War, which saw Argentina and Brazil allied against Paraguay. She was launched on 8 January 1868 and commissioned later that month. Together with the ironclads Silvado and Cabral, Piauí passed the weakened Paraguayan fortifications at Humaitá on 21 July 1868. She bombarded Asunción that same day. The monitor and a number of Brazilian ironclads bombarded Paraguayan batteries at Angostura, downstream of Asunción, on 28 October, 19 November and 26 November. Piauí, together with her sister ships Ceará and Santa Catharina, broke through the Paraguayan defenses at Guaraio on 29 April 1869 and drove off the defenders. On 31 August 1869 the monitor unsuccessfully tried to locate and destroy the remnants of the Paraguayan Navy on the Manduvirá River. In the 1880s the ship's armament was reinforced with a pair of 11-millimeter (0.43 in) machine guns. After the war she was assigned to the Mato Grosso Flotilla and was scrapped in 1893.
