= Brazilian ironclad Brasil =

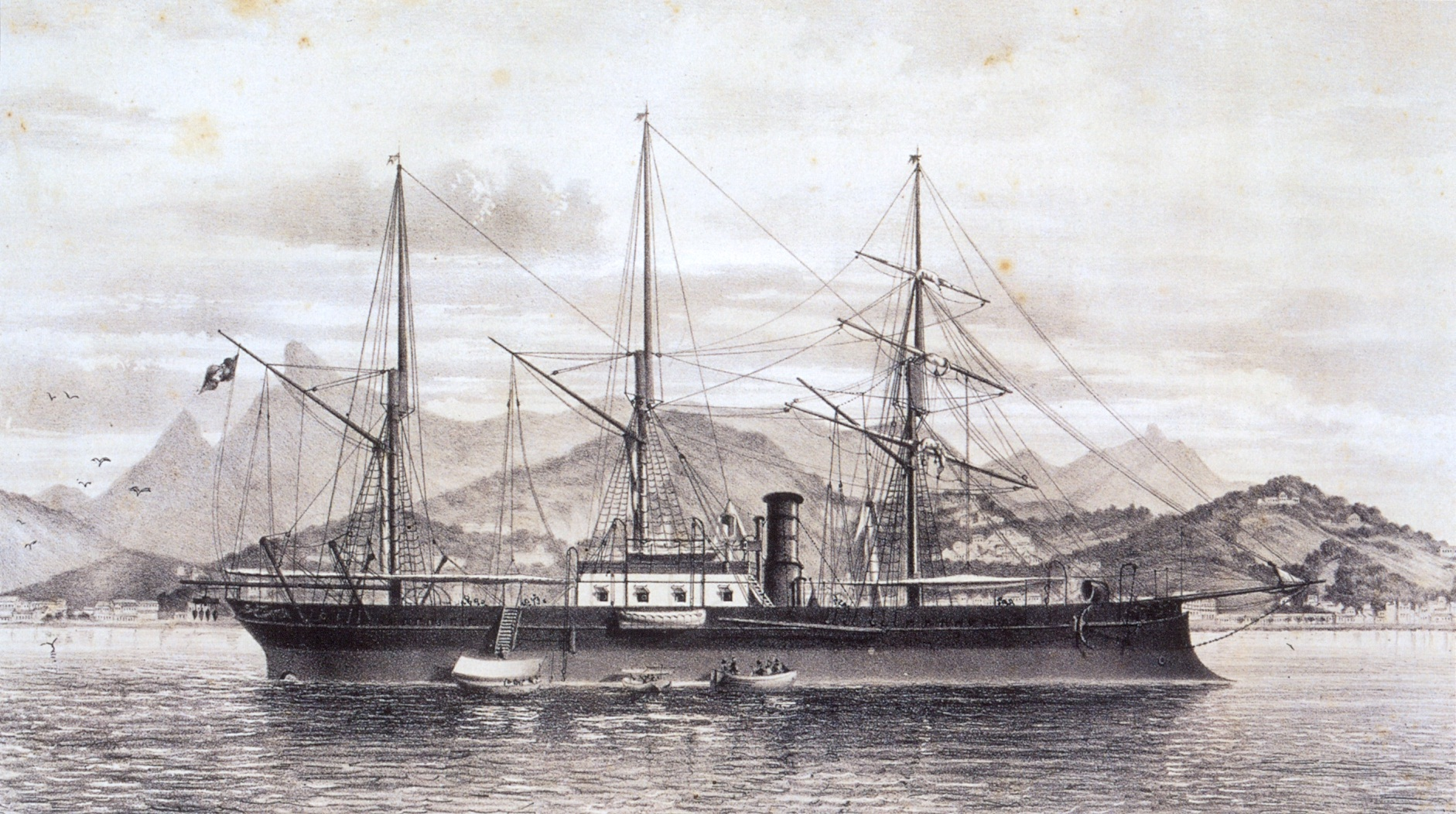
- Brasil in Guanabara Bay before its departure to Paraguay

Class overview
- Preceded by: None
- Succeeded by: Barroso
- Built: 1864–1865
- In service: 1865–1890
- Completed: 1
- Scrapped: 1

History

Empire of Brazil
- Name: Brasil
- Namesake: Brazil
- Ordered: 5 January 1864
- Builder: Forges et Chantiers de la Méditerranée, La Seyne-sur-Mer
- Cost: £60,000
- Laid down: 1864
- Launched: 23 December 1864
- Commissioned: 2 March 1865
- Fate: Converted into a floating battery, 1890?

General characteristics
- Class & type: Armored corvette
- Displacement: 1,518 metric tons (1,494 long tons)
- Length: 63.41 m (208 ft 0 in)
- Beam: 10.75 m (35 ft 3 in)
- Draft: 3.81 m (12.5 ft)
- Installed power: 250 nominal horsepower; 2 boilers
- Propulsion: 1 shaft, 1 steam engine,
- Speed: 10.5 knots (19.4 km/h; 12.1 mph)
- Armament: 4 × 70-pounder Whitworth guns; 4 × 68-pounder guns
- Armor: Belt: 90–114 mm (3.5–4.5 in); Casemate: 102 mm (4.0 in)

The Brazilian ironclad Brasil was an armored corvette built in France for the Brazilian Navy in the mid-1860s. Configured as a central-battery ironclad, she served during the 1864–70 War of the Triple Alliance between Brazil, Argentina and Uruguay against Paraguay.

== Design and description ==
Concerned about the construction of ironclad warships in Europe and North America, the Imperial Brazilian Minister of the Navy, Rear Admiral Joaquim Raimundo de Lamare, sent a small mission to Europe to study the latest advances in armor and steam propulsion technology. Upon its return in March 1863, it brought back plans and estimates for a small armored corvette as well as river gunboats to be built in France.

Brasil measured 63.41 meters (208 ft 0 in) overall, and had a beam of 10.75 meters (35 ft 3 in). She had a maximum draft of 3.81 meters (12 ft 6 in) and displaced 1,518 metric tons (1,494 long tons). The ship had a simple single-expansion steam engine, rated at 250 nominal horsepower, that used steam generated by two boilers to drive a single four-bladed propeller. Designed for a speed of 10.5 knots (19.4 km/h; 12.1 mph), Brasil reached 11.7 knots (21.7 km/h; 13.5 mph) during her sea trials off Rio de Janeiro. The ship carried 170 tonnes (167 long tons) of coal although nothing is known about her range or endurance. She was fully rigged with three masts and a bowsprit and had a sail area of 550 square meters (5,900 sq ft).

The ship was armed with four 70-pounder Whitworth rifled muzzle-loading guns and four smoothbore 68-pounder guns. Brasil had a complete waterline belt of wrought iron that ranged in thickness from 114 millimeters (4.5 in) amidships to 90 millimeters (3.5 in) at the ends of the ship. The casemate was 102 millimeters (4.0 in) thick. Both the belt and casemate armor were backed by 230 millimeters (9.1 in) of wood.

== Construction and service ==
Brasil, named for the nation, was ordered on 5 January 1864 from the French shipbuilding company Forges et Chantiers de la Méditerranée. She cost £60,000 which was raised by popular subscription. The ship was laid down at the company's La Seyne-sur-Mer shipyard later in the year and launched on 23 December. She was completed on 2 March 1865.

== See also ==
- List of historical ships of the Brazilian Navy

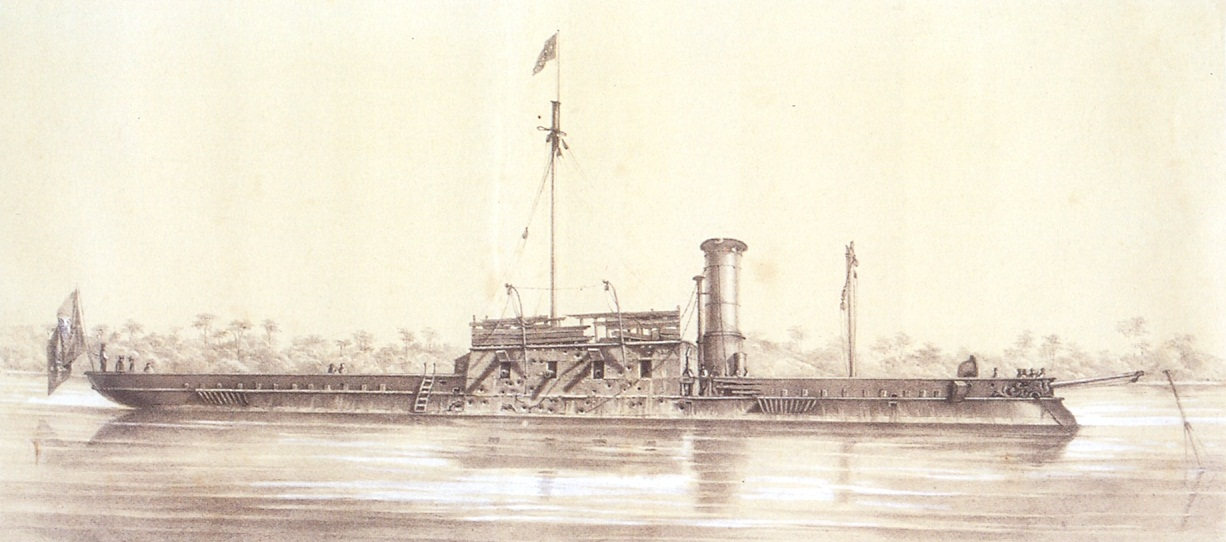
A heavily damaged Brasil (without masts) after the attack on Curuzu Fort, downstream of Curupaity, 1866
