= Brazilian monitor Bahia =

Brazilian military vessel

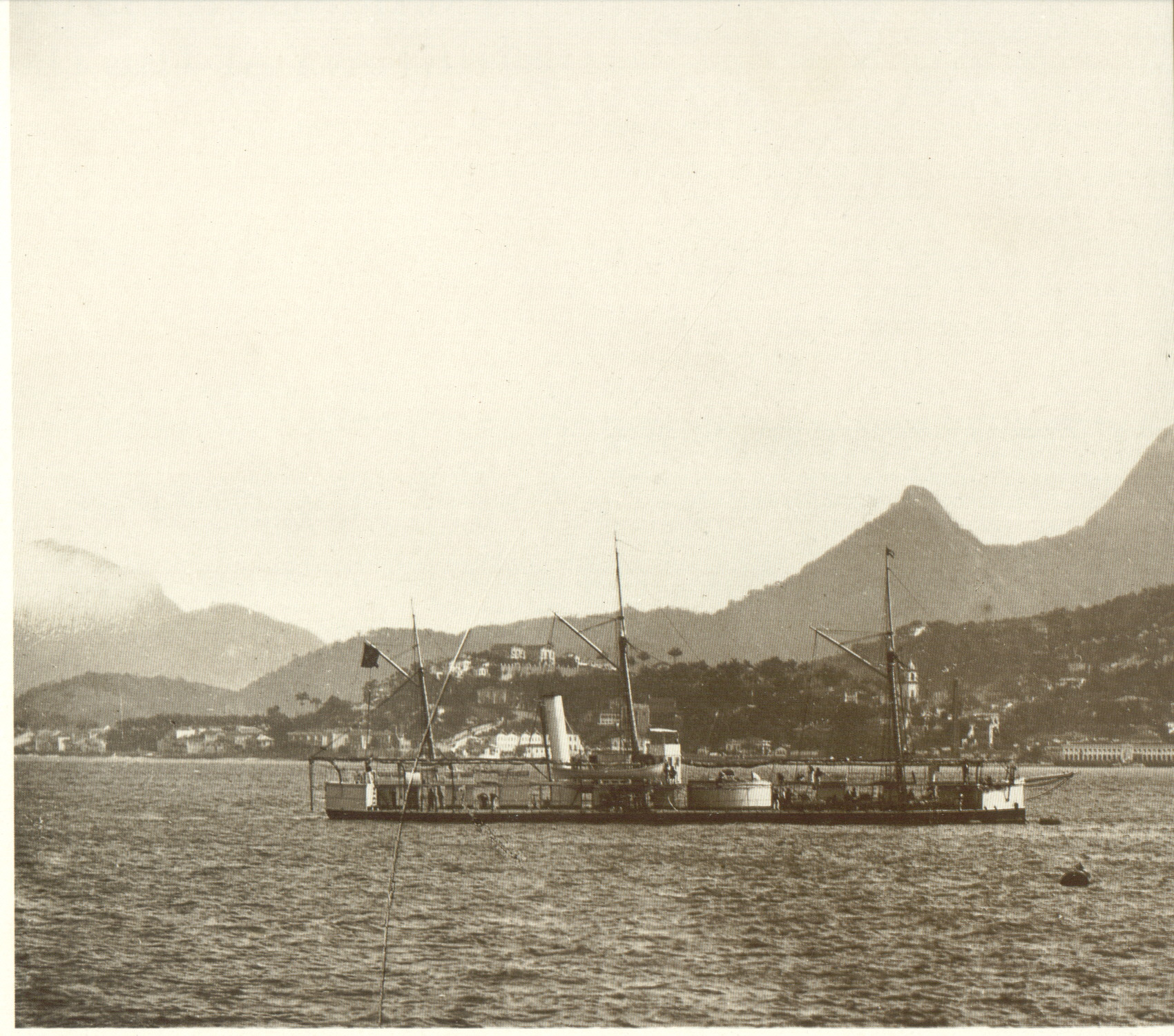
- Bahia at anchor after her 1885 refit

Class overview
- Preceded by: Brasil
- Succeeded by: Barroso
- Built: 1865–1866
- In service: 1866–1894
- In commission: 1866–1894
- Completed: 1
- Scrapped: 1

History

Empire of Brazil
- Name: Bahia
- Namesake: Bahia
- Builder: Laird Brothers, Birkenhead
- Laid down: 1864
- Launched: 11 June 1865
- Completed: 22 January 1866
- Stricken: 1894

General characteristics
- Type: Monitor
- Displacement: 928 long tons (943 t)
- Length: 175 ft 8 in (53.5 m) (p.p.)
- Beam: 35 ft 2 in (10.7 m)
- Draft: 7 ft 9 in (2.4 m)
- Installed power: 2 boilers; 1,640 ihp (1,220 kW)
- Propulsion: 2 shafts, 2 trunk steam engines
- Sail plan: Barque-rigged
- Speed: 10 knots (19 km/h; 12 mph)
- Complement: 120 officers and men
- Armament: 2 × 120 pdr (7 in (178 mm)) rifled muzzle-loading guns
- Armor: Belt: 3–4.5 in (76–114 mm); Gun turret: 4.5 in (114 mm)

The Brazilian monitor Bahia was originally ordered by Paraguay in 1864 with the name Minerva, but was sold to Brazil when Paraguay defaulted on the payments. She participated in the 1864–1870 War of the Triple Alliance between Brazil, Argentina and Uruguay against Paraguay, and took part in the Passage of Humaitá.

== Design and description ==
Bahia was an iron-hulled, single-turret river monitor. She was 175 feet 8 inches (53.5 m) long between perpendiculars. The ship had a beam of 35 feet 2 inches (10.7 m) and a maximum draft of 7 feet 9 inches (2.4 m). Bahia displaced 928 long tons (943 t) and was fitted with a ram bow. Her crew consisted of 125 officers and enlisted men. The ship had a pair of horizontal trunk steam engines, each driving one propeller, using steam from two boilers. The engines produced a total of 1,640 indicated horsepower (1,220 kW) and gave Bahia a maximum speed of 10 knots (19 km/h; 12 mph). She was barque-rigged with three pole masts and a bowsprit.

Bahia was armed with a pair of 120-pounder (7-inch (178 mm)) Whitworth rifled muzzle-loading guns in a twin-gun turret amidships. She had a complete waterline belt of wrought iron that ranged in thickness from 4.5 inches (114 mm) amidships to 3 inches (76 mm) at the ends of the ship. The gun turret was protected by 4.5 inches of armor.

== Construction and service ==
Bahia, named after the eponymous Brazilian state, was originally ordered by Paraguay from the British shipbuilding firm of Laird Brothers and was laid down in 1864 with the name of Minerva and the yard number 326 at their Birkenhead shipyard. She was purchased by Brazil the following year, after the start of the war when Paraguay was cut off from the outside world and could no longer make payments. The ship was launched on 11 June 1865 and completed on 22 January 1866. Bahia served as the Brazilian flagship during the Passage of Humaitá on 19 February 1868.

Bahia was refitted in 1885 during which her boilers were replaced and a bridge was added between the turret and the funnel.

== See also ==
- List of historical ships of the Brazilian Navy
