= 70-pounder Whitworth naval gun =

70-pounder Whitworth gun
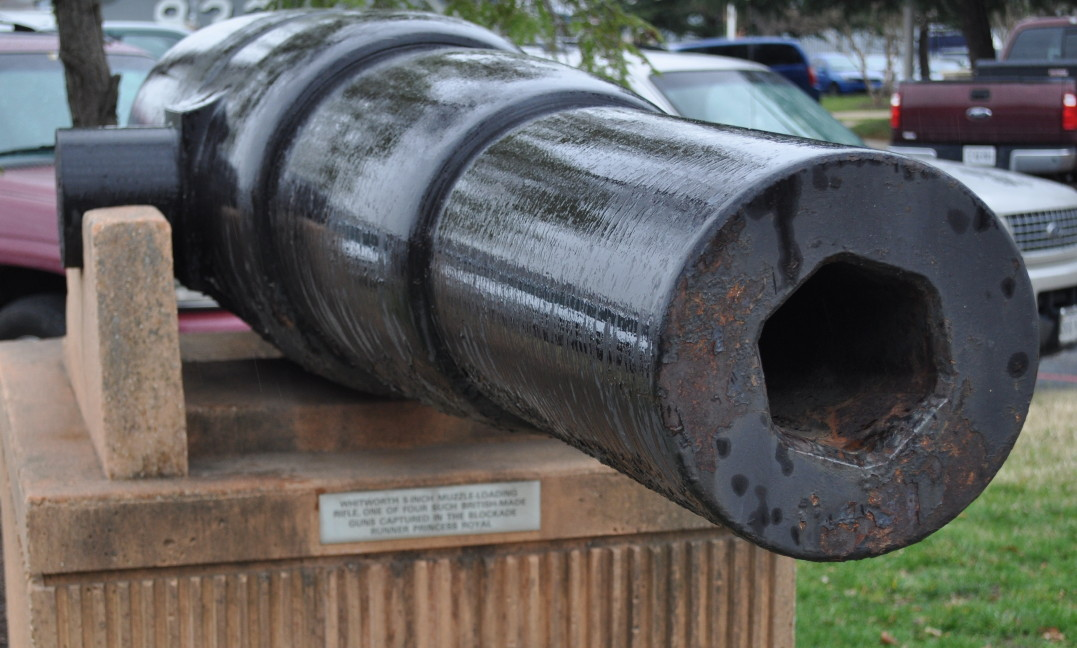
- Gun from Princess Royal, in Willard Park at the Washington Navy Yard. Notice the hexagonal bore.
- Type: Naval gun
- Place of origin: United Kingdom

Service history
- In service: 1863–
- Used by: Confederate States, United States, Empire of Brazil
- Wars: American Civil War, Paraguayan War

Production history
- Designer: Joseph Whitworth
- Manufacturer: Joseph Whitworth
- Unit cost: £3500
- Produced: 1863?–

Specifications
- Mass: 8,582 pounds (3,892.7 kg)
- Length: 118 inches (2.997 m)
- Shell: Solid shot Explosive shell
- Shell weight: 81 pounds (36.7 kg)
- Calibre: 5.5-inch (140 mm)
- Maximum firing range: 5,540 yards (5,070 m)
- Filling: Black powder
- Filling weight: 3 pounds 12 ounces (1.7 kg)

The 70-pounder Whitworth naval gun was designed by Joseph Whitworth during the 1860s. It was a rifled muzzle loader and used his hexagonal, rifled-bore design.

== Principle ==
The gun used polygonal rifling, a principle invented by Whitworth in 1853. The concept was to use the hexagon to impart a very rapid spin to the projectile.

The method of manufacturing the rifling was thus described by the Report of the Armstrong & Whitworth Committee of the British War Office (1866):

[I]t may be described in general terms as a hexagonal bore with a rapid twist, although, strictly speaking, the bore is not hexagonal, but has 24 surfaces. The gun is, in the first instance, bored out cylindrically; a part of this original bore is left in the centre of each side of the hexagon, making six surfaces, then there are the coming out sides of the hexagon which give six more surfaces, and the going in sides giving also six surfaces, and lastly, the rounding off of the angles, which give six more, making 24 surfaces in all.

The projectile was hexagonal to match. The gun was highly accurate at long ranges, but the very precise manufacturing tolerances required a high standard of maintenance by the artillerymen. Wrote Jeff Kinard: "The odd shape of the projectile produced a weird, unnerving shriek as it traveled through the air."

== Service ==
=== American civil war ===
Four guns were captured by the United States Navy on the blockade-runner Princess Royal on 29 January 1863. Two were sent to Morris Island, Charleston, South Carolina to bombard Fort Sumter during the summer of 1863. One gun had a premature detonation that killed four of its crew when trying to ram a projectile home. Another gun was disabled after 111 shots when its inner tube moved back far enough to block the vent.

=== Paraguayan war ===
A number of 70-pounders as well as larger calibers were bought by the Imperial Brazilian Navy and used to arm some of its ironclads during the Paraguayan War in the late 1860s. British lieutenant colonel George Thompson of the Paraguayan army recorded that the Brazilians cut the fuses to the wrong length, so the shells often failed to explode. Thousands of them were collected by the Paraguayans, who made a gun of their own ("a beautiful casting") at their foundry at Asunción – on the Whitworth principle – called the Criollo; this gun shot them back at the Brazilians.

Thompson recorded that

For precision and range, Whitworth's guns are splendid weapons, but they require good gunners... Whitworth's balls had such a high velocity, that the report of the gun, and the shot flying by, were both heard at the same moment. The Paraguayans, from the sound these balls made going through the air, called Whitworth's balls 'phews'.

All of the Brazilian river monitors who effected the Passage of Humaitá − described as a nearly impossible feat − were equipped with 70-pounder Whitworth guns; the larger ironclad vessels who accompanied them had Whitworth guns of larger calibre.

== See also ==
- 120-pounder Whitworth naval gun

== Gallery ==
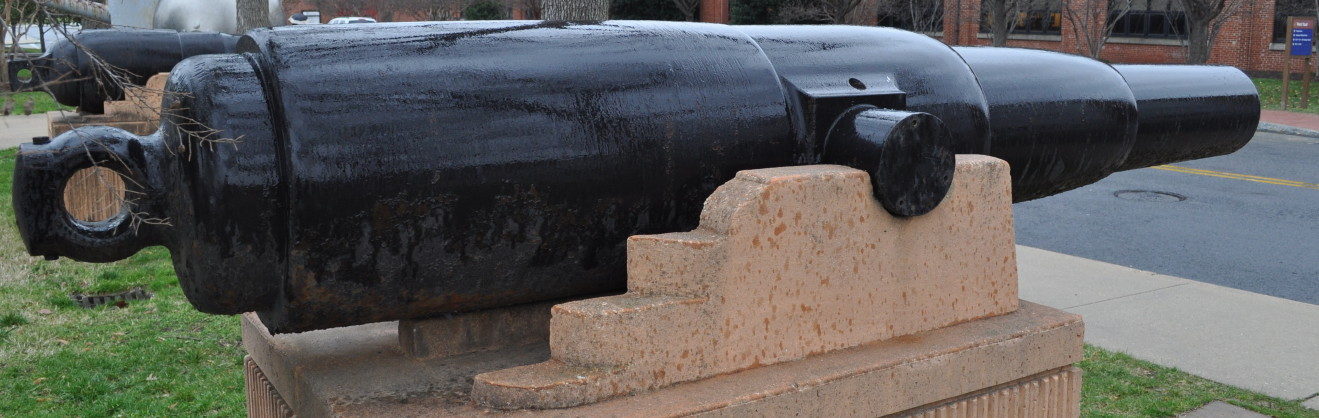
On a naval carriage

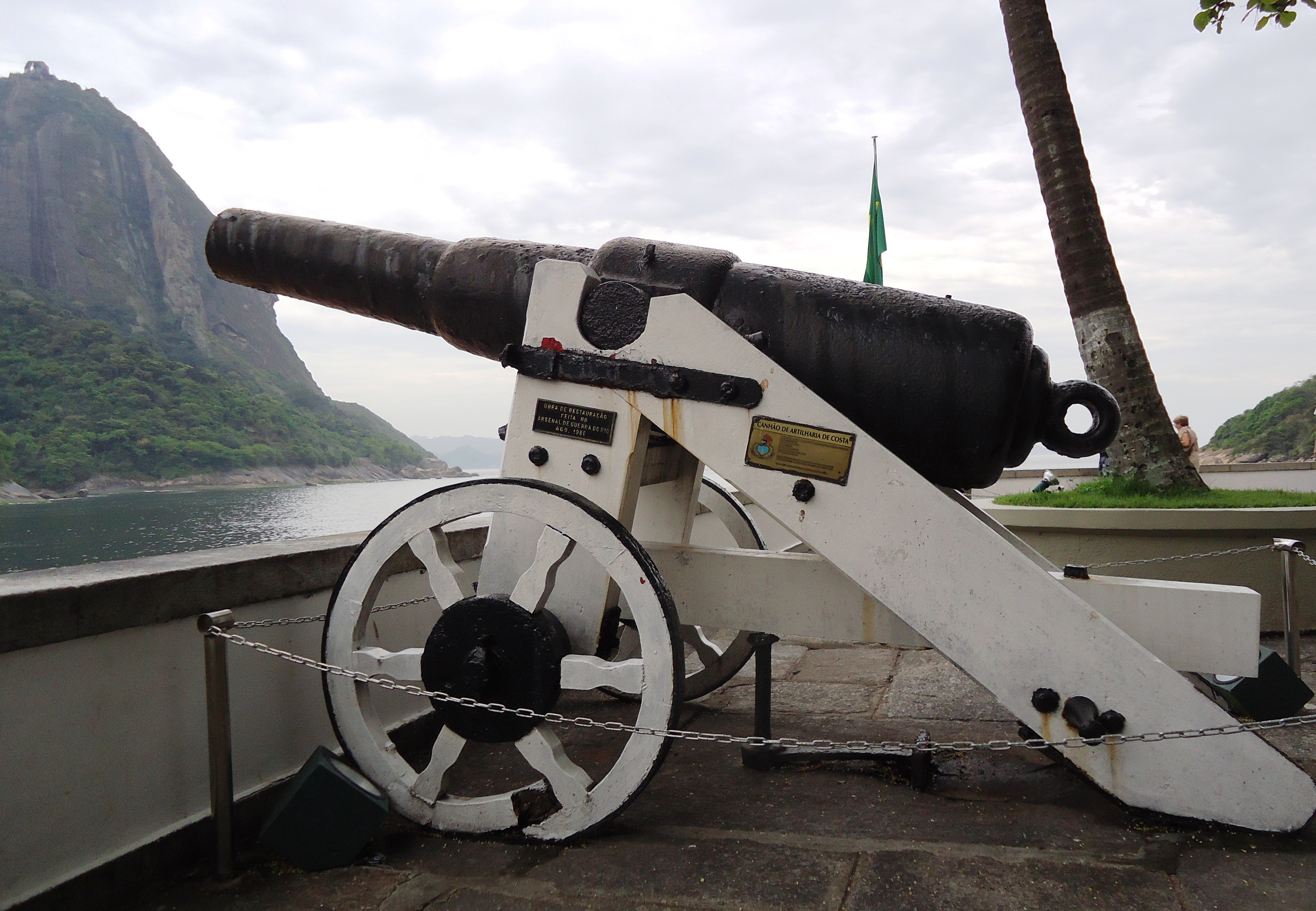
On a coastal carriage in Rio de Janeiro
