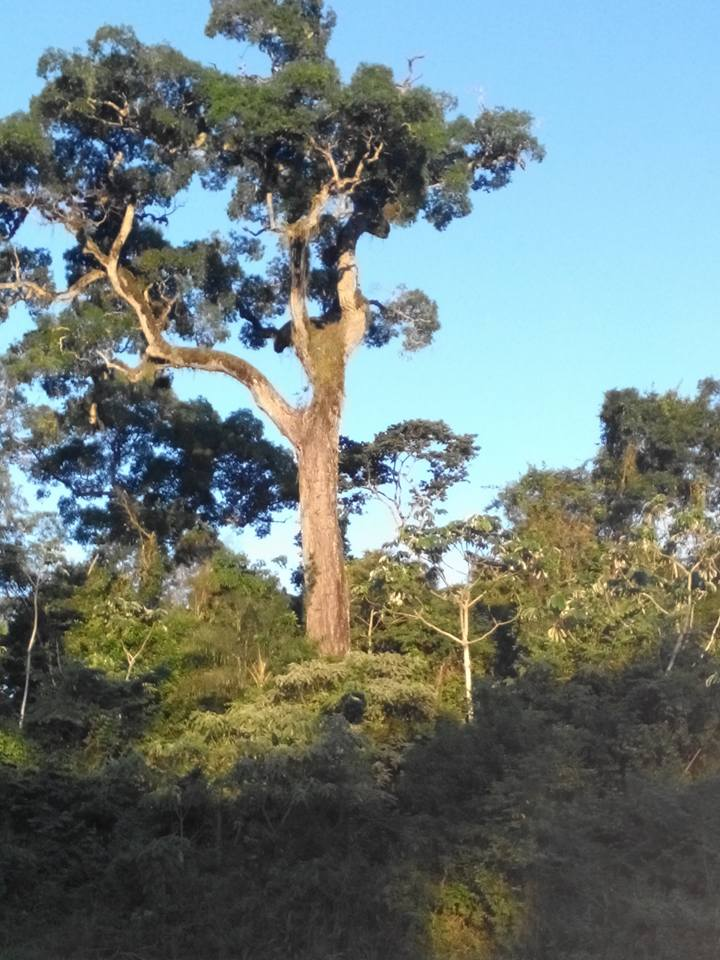

Conservation status
- Endangered (IUCN 2.3)

Scientific classification
- Kingdom: Plantae
- Clade: Tracheophytes
- Clade: Angiosperms
- Clade: Eudicots
- Clade: Asterids
- Order: Gentianales
- Family: Apocynaceae
- Genus: Aspidosperma
- Species: A. polyneuron

Binomial name
- Aspidosperma polyneuron Müll.Arg.

Synonyms
- Aspidosperma dugandii Standl.; Aspidosperma peroba Saldanha; Aspidosperma polyneuron var. genuinum Hassl.; Aspidosperma polyneuron var. longifolium Hassl.; Aspidosperma polyneuron var. puberulum Handro; Aspidosperma venosum Müll.Arg.; Thyroma polyneura (Müll.Arg.) Miers

= Aspidosperma polyneuron =

Species of flowering plant

Aspidosperma polyneuron, commonly known as Peroba and Peroba Rosa, is a species of tree native to eastern and southern Brazil, northeastern Argentina (Misiones Province), and Paraguay in eastern South America, and to Colombia, Peru, and Venezuela in northwestern South America. It is a characteristic tree of the Atlantic Forest of eastern Brazil. In addition, it is useful for beekeeping.

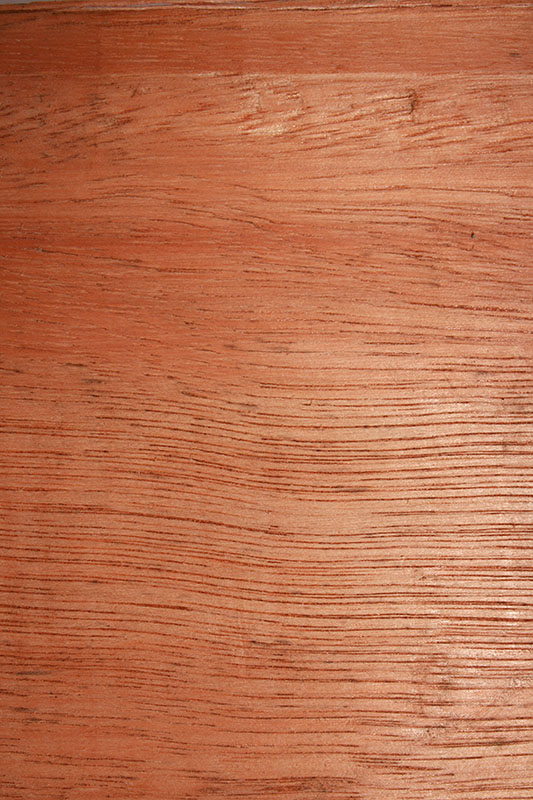
Closeup of Peroba Rosa wood

It is a popular timber tree, and has been over-exploited across parts of its range. The IUCN Red List assesses the species as Endangered.

A carboline alkaloid contained in Aspidosperma polyneuron is called Polyneuridine.

== Description ==
It grows up to a height of 40 m, at a rate of 50 cm/year; in the forest, it is an emergent tree.

It flowers from September to November and fruits from October to November.

== Uses ==
The wood is dark pink, with a specific gravity of 0.7 g/cm³. It is easy to work. In Argentina, Paraguay, and Brazil, it is used for construction, furniture, carpentry, and flooring.
