= Julio de Vedia =

Argentine general (1826–1892)

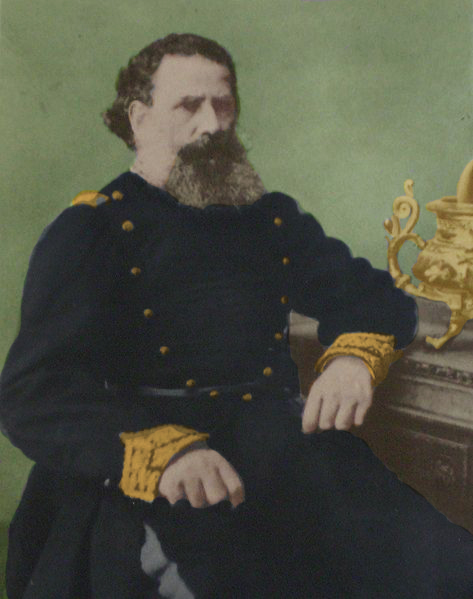

1st Governor of the Chaco Governorate
- In office 31 January 1872 – 31 January 1875
- President: Bartolomé Mitre
- Vice President: Adolfo Alsina
- Preceded by: Office Established
- Succeeded by: Belisario Gache

Personal details
- Born: 20 January 1826 Buenos Aires, Buenos Aires Province, Río de la Plata
- Died: 26 August 1892 (aged 66) Buenos Aires, Argentina
- Spouse: Lasthenia del Carmen Videla

Military service
- Allegiance: Cerrito Government; State of Buenos Aires; Argentina
- Branch: National Army of Uruguay; Argentine Army
- Years of service: 1838–1880; 1883–1892
- Rank: General de división
- Battles/wars: List: Uruguayan Civil War; Great Siege of Montevideo; Argentine Civil Wars; Battle of Cepeda; Paraguayan War; Corrientes campaign; Siege of Uruguaiana; Humaitá campaign; Battle of Paso de Patria; Battle of Itapirú; Battle of Estero Bellaco; Battle of Tuyutí; Battle of Yataytí Corá; Battle of Paso Pucú; Pikysyry campaign; Sacking of Asunción; Campaign of the Hills; Battle of Piribebuy; Jordanist Rebellion; Battle of Don Gonzalo; Revolution of 1880; Battle of Puente Alsina; Battle of Los Corrales

Julio Fabián de Vedia Pérez (1826–1892) was an Argentine Divisional General who was prominent within the Paraguayan War and the Conquest of the Desert. He was known for founding the city of Nueve de Julio, Buenos Aires, the 1st Governor of the Chaco Governorate as well as the brother-in-law of President Bartolomé Mitre.

== Argentine Civil Wars ==
He was the son of General Nicolás de Vedia and Manuela Josefa Gabina Pérez Pagola. In 1838 he accompanied his father who was a political opponent of Juan Manuel de Rosas into exile in Montevideo. He joined Fructuoso Rivera's army as an artillery officer and fought under the orders of his older brother Joaquín de Vedia in the Battle of Arroyo Grande. He joined the military forces of the resistance against the Great Siege of Montevideo by Manuel Oribe in which his father had an important position. He later went to the Cologne garrison and was considered a war hero for his firm defense of the city. He remained in the Montevideo garrison after Oribe's defeat which resulted in his absence from the Battle of Caseros and returned to Buenos Aires in 1855.

He joined the army of the State of Buenos Aires, under the orders of his brother-in-law, Colonel Bartolomé Mitre. He was assigned to a fort in Azul and carried out a campaign against chief Calfucurá which was relatively successful, compared to the disaster of a recent campaign by Mitre. He won a victory at Pigüé in February 1858, and was promoted to colonel. He fought in the Battle of Cepeda and two days later, in a naval combat off San Nicolás de los Arroyos under the orders of Marine Colonel Antonio Susini. He also fought in the Battle of Pavón as head of the 1st Cavalry Regiment. He remained the following years on the frontier with the Native Americans and founded the town of Nuevo de Julio.

== Paraguayan War ==
At the outbreak of the Paraguayan War, he rejected the position of war minister offered to him by his brother-in-law, President Mitre and went to the front. Participating in almost all the operations, and fought in the battles of Uruguaiana, Paso de la Patria, Itapirú, Estero Bellaco, Tuyutí and Yataytí Corá. When he was promoted to brigadier general, he fought in Curupayty and Paso Pucú. Despite the fact that he was militarily capable, it was said that many of his promotions were due to the fact that he was President Mitre's brother-in-law.

At the end of 1868, he went to the Corrientes Province to crush the rebellion of General Nicanor Cáceres who intended to defend the governor of the province against the allies of the Mitre government who had just overthrown him. He returned to Paraguay as chief of staff of the army, and participated in the Battle of Piribebuy and the Sacking of Asunción.

== Governorship and City Planning ==
In January 1872, he was appointed Governor of the Chaco Governorate. He established the municipalities of Villa Occidental, Formosa, and San Fernando (modern-day Resistencia). He organized the first justices of the peace, established some immigrant colonies, and led some expeditions into the interior of the territory, which was still in the hands of the Tobas, Vilelas, and Wichis tribes. For some time, he was given command of the forces in Villa Occidental and took the steps prior to the founding of the city of Formosa.

In May 1873, he commanded the national forces in the second war against the Entre Ríos caudillo Ricardo López Jordán. Vedia defeated him in the Battle of Don Gonzalo, forcing him to leave the country. He returned to the Chaco government until he was replaced in 1875. In 1876 he was appointed director of the Military College of the Nation. In 1880, he participated in the Revolution of 1880 led by Carlos Tejedor, and was the commander of the military forces that fought in the battles of Los Corrales and Puente Alsina. Due to the failure of the revolution, he was discharged from the Argentine Army.

Between 1880 and 1883, when he remained out of the Argentine Army, he worked as an auctioneer for the Banco Hipotecario. He was reinstated in August 1883 and was immediately promoted to Divisional General. He was part of the General Staff of the Army, the director of the Military College and the inspector of artillery and cavalry weapons. He was also a member of the Superior War Junta. 1 He died in Buenos Aires on 26 August 1892. He was married to the Chilean Lasthenia del Carmen Videla. He was also the brother of Delfina de Vedia de Mitre who was the wife of President Bartolomé Mitre.

His remains officially rest in the La Recoleta Cemetery although around 1979, when his coffin was planned to be transferred to Nueve de Julio, Buenos Aires, they couldn't be found.

== Legacy ==
Vedia Street within the city of Buenos Aires simultaneously honors General Julio de Vedia and his father Nicolás de Vedia. In the city of Nueve de Julio, an avenue, a provincial hospital and a municipally run Museum, Archive and Cultural Center bear his name. A bust of him, the work of the sculptor Luis Perlotti is exhibited in the hall of the Municipality of Nueve de Julio. The town of General Vedia, Chaco Province, Argentina bears his name in his honor.
