= Assault on the battleships Barroso and Rio Grande =

Battle in the Paraguayan War

Assault on Barroso and Rio Grande
- Part of the Humaitá campaign
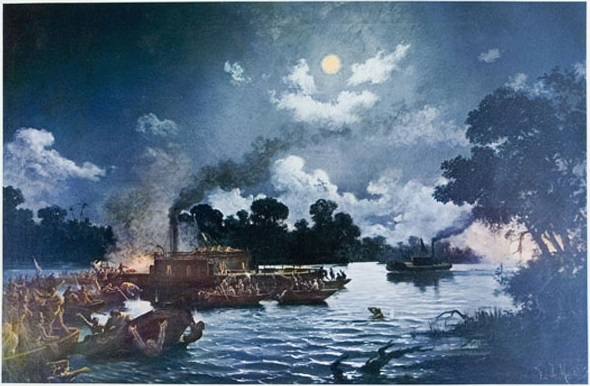
- Assault on the battleship Barroso and monitor Rio Grande, National Historical Museum collection
Date	9 July 1868
Location	Tagy, left bank of the Paraguay River
Result	Brazilian victory

Belligerents
Paraguay	Empire of Brazil

Commanders and leaders
Francisco Cabriza	Artur Silveira da Mota; Antônio Joaquim †; Mena Barreto

Strength
20 canoes: 270 men	2 ironclads: Barroso; Rio Grande; 40th Fatherland Volunteers Corps

Casualties and losses
74: 42 killed 32 captured	11: 3 killed 8 wounded

The assault on the battleship Barroso and the monitor Rio Grande, also known as assault on the battleships at Tagy, was a Paraguayan naval operation carried out during the Paraguayan War. The Imperial Brazilian Navy was present in the main actions of the allied forces. President Francisco Solano López knew of the threat that the navy posed and wanted to capture some of its ships, the ironclads. The seizure was also seen as a form of compensation for the losses incurred as a result of the war. Assault plans were created and executed in 1868.

On 9 July 1868, at 11:50 pm, 270 Paraguayan soldiers, known as bogavantes, attacked two Brazilian battleships, Barroso and Rio Grande, anchored near the Tagy ravine, located on the left bank of the Paraguay River. The approach attempt was not simultaneous, which allowed each vessel to support itself with their respective artillery pieces. Imperial Brazilian Army infantry encamped near Tagy also supported the ships. Despite being well armed and having managed to climb to the deck of both vessels, the bogavantes were not successful, being quickly repelled. The Paraguayans suffered 74 casualties and the Brazilians 11.

After the defeat of the bogavantes, the last forces that protected the fortress of Humaitá and that depended on their victory abandoned the stronghold and tried to flee to the Chaco, however they were surrounded and defeated by Brazilian troops. The fortress was occupied shortly thereafter.

== Background ==
The defeat of the Paraguayan navy in the Naval Battle of Riachuelo, on 11 June 1865, forced Solano López's forces to retreat to their own territory. Then, the allied invasion of Paraguay began with the Battle of Paso de Patria in 1866, when the allies landed in the country. The tactic employed by the invading forces was the use of the Imperial Navy as a support force for the troops on land, transporting men, supplies and fighting the various fortifications and vessels along the Paraguay River and its tributaries. However, the allied defeat at the fortress of Curupayty on 22 September 1866 halted their operations for at least a year until allied naval forces broke through the fort on 15 August 1867, supported by land troops who also carried out the capture of the Tagy ravine, located on the left bank of the river and above the fortress of Humaitá, another stronghold to be overcome. With the conquest of Curupayty and Tagy, the allies were able to coordinate logistics that supported the battleships stationed below Humaitá so that they could also force their transposition. It was not until 19 February 1868 that six Brazilian ironclads successfully transposed Humaitá.

After the passage, Humaitá became unreachable by the river, which forced the Paraguayans to build a road in the Chaco that linked the fortress to the fort of Timbó so that supplies were not cut. However, the constant bombardment by Brazilian ironclads and the siege mounted by allied forces on land contributed to the Paraguayan decision to abandon Humaitá. Such events probably prompted the Paraguayans to draw up plans to assault the other ships anchored between Humaitá and Curupayty. The first movement occurred shortly after the passage on 19 February, when a fleet of 40 canoes tried to board the Brazilian monitor Alagoas but failed. The Paraguayans again attempted an assault, this time against two battleships, Cabral and Lima Barros, on 2 March, but once again failed after being repelled by the ships' crews and support from other vessels. After this latter failure, López ordered the abandonment of Humaitá with over 12,000 troops the following day.

These last Paraguayan actions led the Brazilian naval command to suspect that a new boarding attempt could occur against ships that were ahead of Humaitá. Indeed, several Paraguayan prisoners, including officers, reported that Solano López was training soldiers from various divisions of the army and navy, known as bogavantes, to board and seize imperial battleships. Second sergeant of the Paraguayan 12th Cavalry Regiment, Evaristo Chamorro, a prisoner since 9 June, reported that López wanted to assault the monitor Rio Grande, anchored in the Tagy ravine, with a force under the command of an ensign who participated in the assault on 2 March. After the battle at Tagy, second sergeant José Fructo Guerrero, another Paraguayan prisoner, confirmed the information given by Chamorro. This account demonstrated that the allies knew an attack on Tagy was expected, but did not know when it would happen.

== Objective, scenario and boarding plan ==
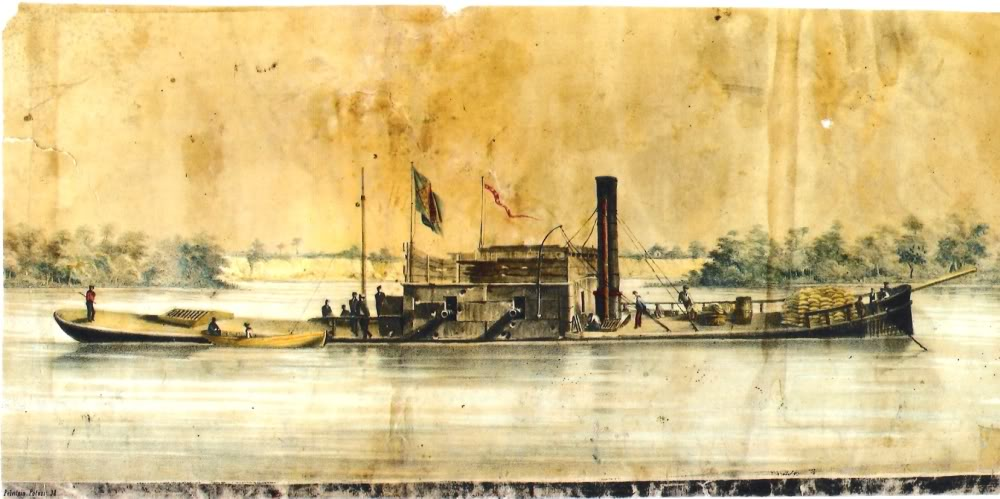
Ironclad Barroso

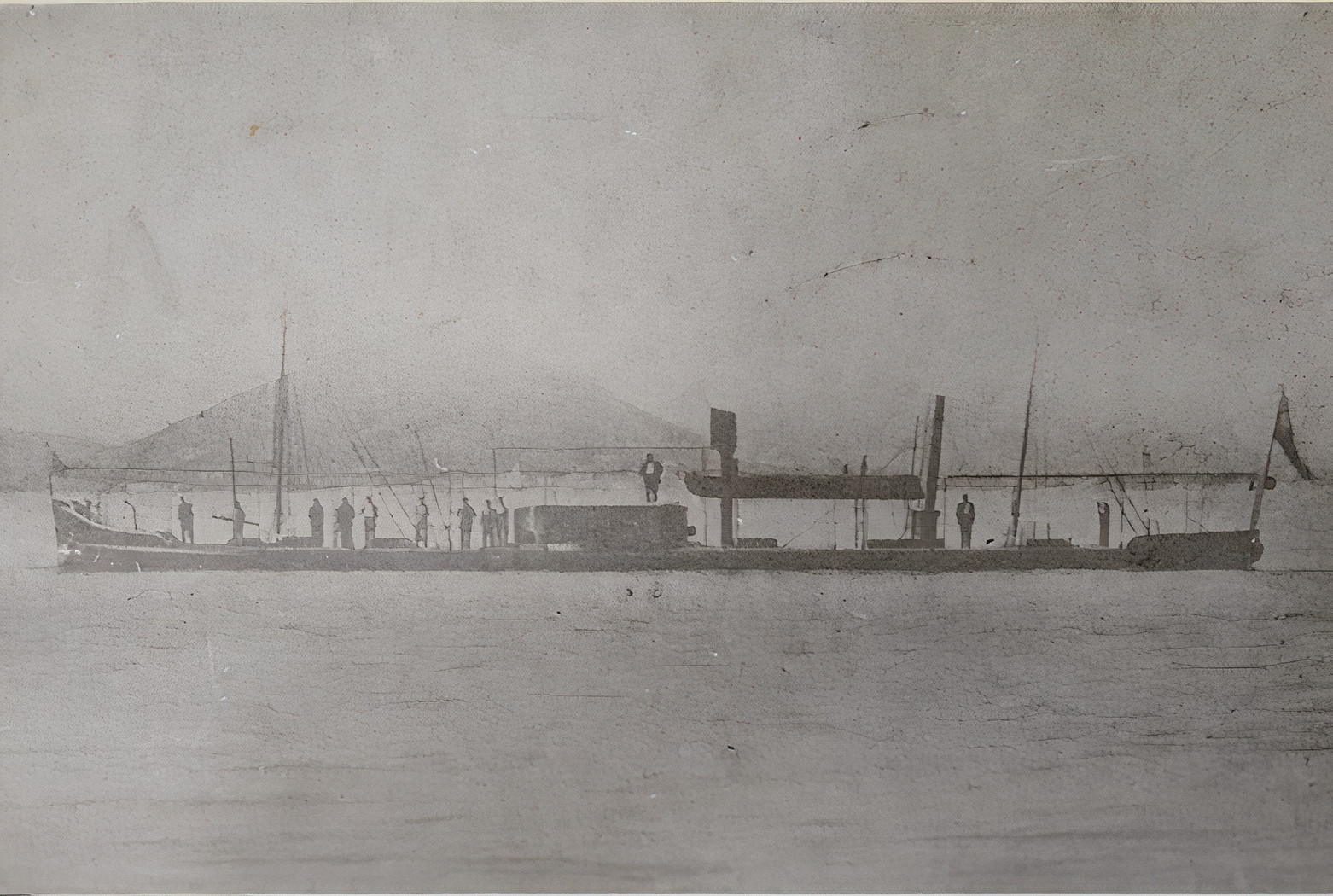
Monitor Alagoas, of the same class as Rio Grande

Witnesses from the Paraguayan side such as George Thompson and Juan Crisóstomo Centurión agree that, when attacking the battleships, the Paraguayans intended to somehow protect the fortress of Humaitá. Soon after the passage of Humaitá by Brazilian ironclads, the siege by the allied troops, the occupation of the Chaco and the abandonment by López, Humaitá was completely unable to receive supplies. Still, the remaining Paraguayan forces wanted at all costs to keep the fortress in their possession. There is also the argument that López wished to obtain these battleships for himself in an attempt to reverse the course of the war in his favor. Another reason would be a kind of revenge by Solano López for the fact that Brazil bought the five battleships that were originally ordered by Paraguay, but that were not delivered due to non-payment by the Paraguayan government, as López knew that his navy was deficient from the beginning. Whatever it is, the approach was based on the principle of taking only one vessel: the monitor Rio Grande.

On 5 July, a conference was held between general Bernardino Caballero, commander of the Timbó fort, and Solano López to report that the bogavante forces were heading from the Chaco to the Bermejo River, from where they would depart to assault the ships, since the mouth of that river was located very close to Tagy. The Brazilian naval command began to receive reports, mainly from Paraguayan deserters, that Paraguayan forces could attack the Brazilian lines coming from the fortifications at Tebicuary. To protect the Tagy ravine, the monitor Rio Grande was ordered to anchor at that position in order to fire at any enemy incursions there. The other five battleships that had passed Humaitá began to bomb this position and Timbó, in addition to serving to transport troops and supplies for the allied forces in the Chaco and also in Tagy. It was during this period that the naval command received information from officer Chamorro about the battleships' boarding preparations.

The bogavantes, as the assault forces were called, were trained in a region that was in the upper part of the mouth of the Tebicuary River in a place where the Paraguay River had a channel. There, they practiced the assault with some wooden steamers that were anchored. These soldiers were drawn from infantry, cavalry and navy units, always soldiers who had a good reputation with their superiors, good swimmers and daring. The place destined for the assault, Tagy, was a ravine erected on the left bank of the Paraguay River. The Paraguayans had garrisoned that position with several cannons in order to try to neutralize the action of the Imperial Navy in that region of the river. However, by that time, such position was already under Brazilian control.

Imperial Army positions existed around the ravine, in addition to a telegraph line that linked the Brazilian base camp to that region. There are few sources that clearly demonstrate the details of the Paraguayan movements before the assault on the battleships. Days before the final attack on 9 July, from 6 to 8 July, the battleships Barroso and Rio Grande were not in Tagy, as they were replenishing their supplies and bombing Timbó. However, on the ninth, both vessels were located by the Paraguayans near Tagy.

Brazilian vessels had a vulnerability that facilitated the assault: their low freeboard. The ironclad Barroso, commanded by Artur Silveira da Mota, later Baron of Jaceguai, had a little more than one meter of freeboard, which decreased even further when the ship had to use its cannons, since about half of the edge was removable, reaching just over 60 centimeters the distance between the main floor and the water line. The Rio Grande belonged to a class of ships specifically designed with low freeboard. This characteristic of the ships allowed for an easier boarding. One resource that could be used was the anti-boarding net, very common on wooden ships at the time. However, if this protection was installed on the battleships it would prevent the use of their weapons, since if used it would destroy the net itself. The most viable solution was to intern the entire crew inside the vessel and carry out the defense from there.

== The boarding ==
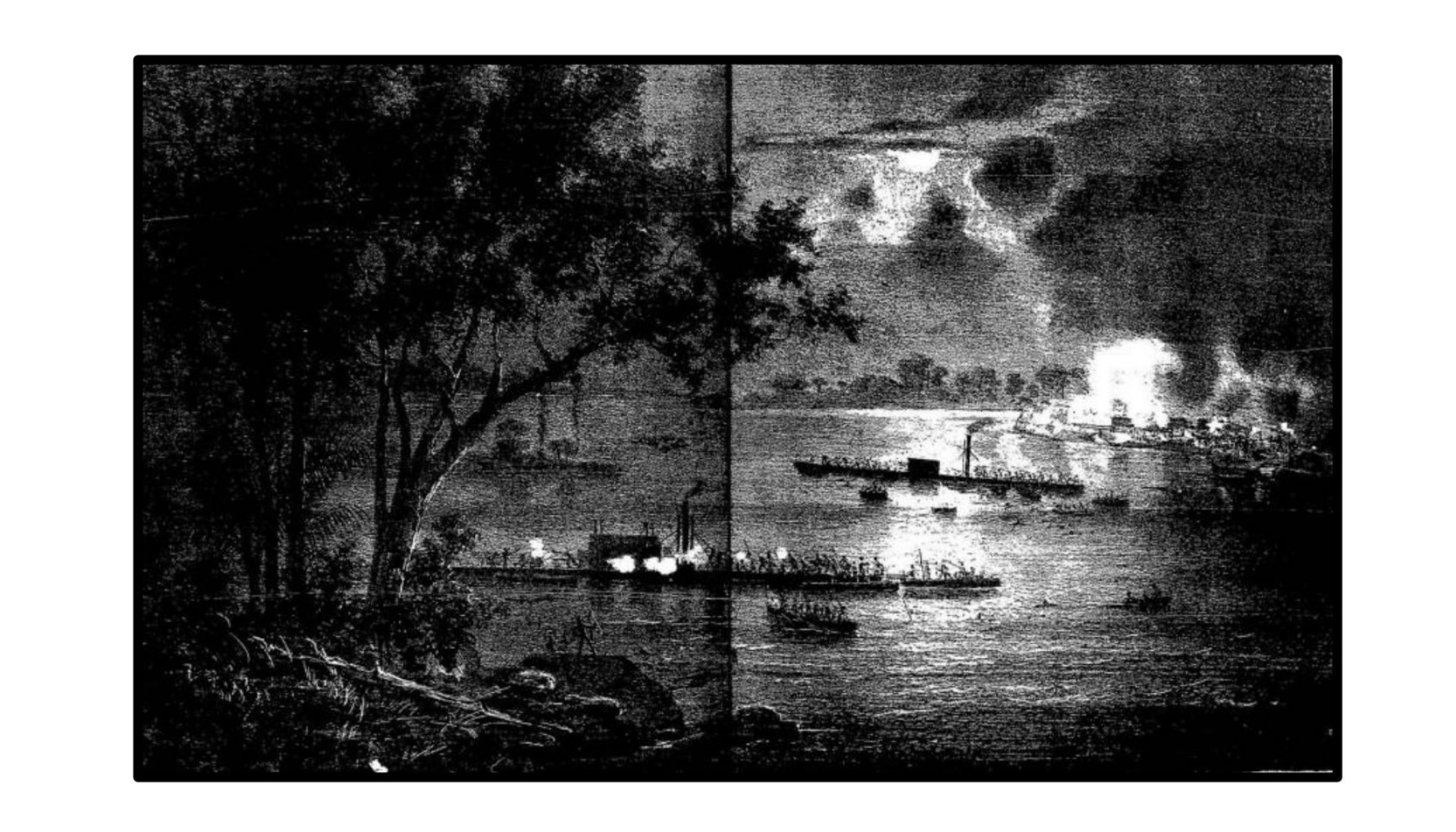
Illustration of the assault by Carlos Linde (Semana Illustrada, 2 Aug. 1868)

The boarders numbered 270 men divided into two divisions of 20 canoes, under the command of major Francisco Lino Cabriza. The Paraguayans used aquatic plants in an attempt to camouflage their approach. The flood period contributed positively to this deception, since the sighting of such plants down the river was common. At 11:50 pm, the first elements of the Paraguayan divisions were sighted by the garrison of Barroso, which totaled 149 crewmen and officers, who were not being taken by surprise due to officer Alfredo Pereira de Araújo Neves acting in advance by suspecting the possible enemy movement against the vessels. However, the Paraguayans managed to surround the ship before the first shot. The assailants jumped on the battleship's deck armed with hand grenades, spears, pikes, hatchets and tubes loaded with asphyxiating materials. As they climbed aboard, they prevented the anchor from being hoisted, perhaps in an attempt to prevent the Barroso from moving and prostrating further below the site and getting close enough to being targeted by the army batteries and the Rio Grande that had not yet been boarded.

The entire Barroso garrison fought the assailants, but a detail that contributed to a more effective defense was that the vessel had a defensive structure called the bulwark above its casemate, from which seven men were garrisoned during the entire battle. If the bogavantes took this position, it would not be possible for the garrison inside the vessel to fight them. The small force above the casemate had a clear path to hit the invaders, unlike the inside crew that could only attack through existing openings. Still, they managed to inflict casualties on the enemy. The commander of Barroso decided to use the forward guns of the battleship only when a considerable number of bogavantes occupied the deck, since after firing the pieces needed men outside for the reloading work, that is, they would hardly be used again. At one point in the engagement, thirty Paraguayans crowded the bow and a single shot from the 120-caliber cannon "was enough to sweep the deck, where only dead bodies or severely wounded remained." The situation was repeated in the stern, which had two cannons loaded, where survivors and others still in the canoes engaged.

Despite the bogavantes' efforts, Barroso managed to move towards the cover of the army's batteries and the Rio Grande monitor, with a crew consisting of 43 men and officers, which was already strafing the survivors in the water with its propeller. Despite having difficulty moving, due to the anchor still being lowered, Barroso prostrated itself next to the Rio Grande and when the Paraguayans spotted it, they tried to attack it too. At that moment, the captain of the Rio Grande, Antônio Joaquim, and some auxiliary soldiers, tried to prevent the ship from being boarded, an act that resulted in the disappearance of the commander and injuries to the sailors. Barroso's approach made it possible to annihilate or capture almost all the Paraguayans on the Rio Grande's deck. At the same time of the naval battle, the Brazilian army moved in order to position itself and beat the Paraguayans with its batteries. The commander of the position, brigadier João Manuel Mena Barreto, placed the 40th Fatherland Volunteer Corps on the river bank, in line, and opened fire on the assailants. Other forces were deployed around the camp as there was information that an attack by the Paraguayan army could take place. The attempted assault against the vessels failed and the Paraguayan survivors tried to swim to the banks of the river, at which point Mena Barreto ordered shrapnel artillery to be fired on them. Mena Barreto sent infantry troops supported by cavalry in pursuit of those who managed to reach the bank. It was the end of the battle.

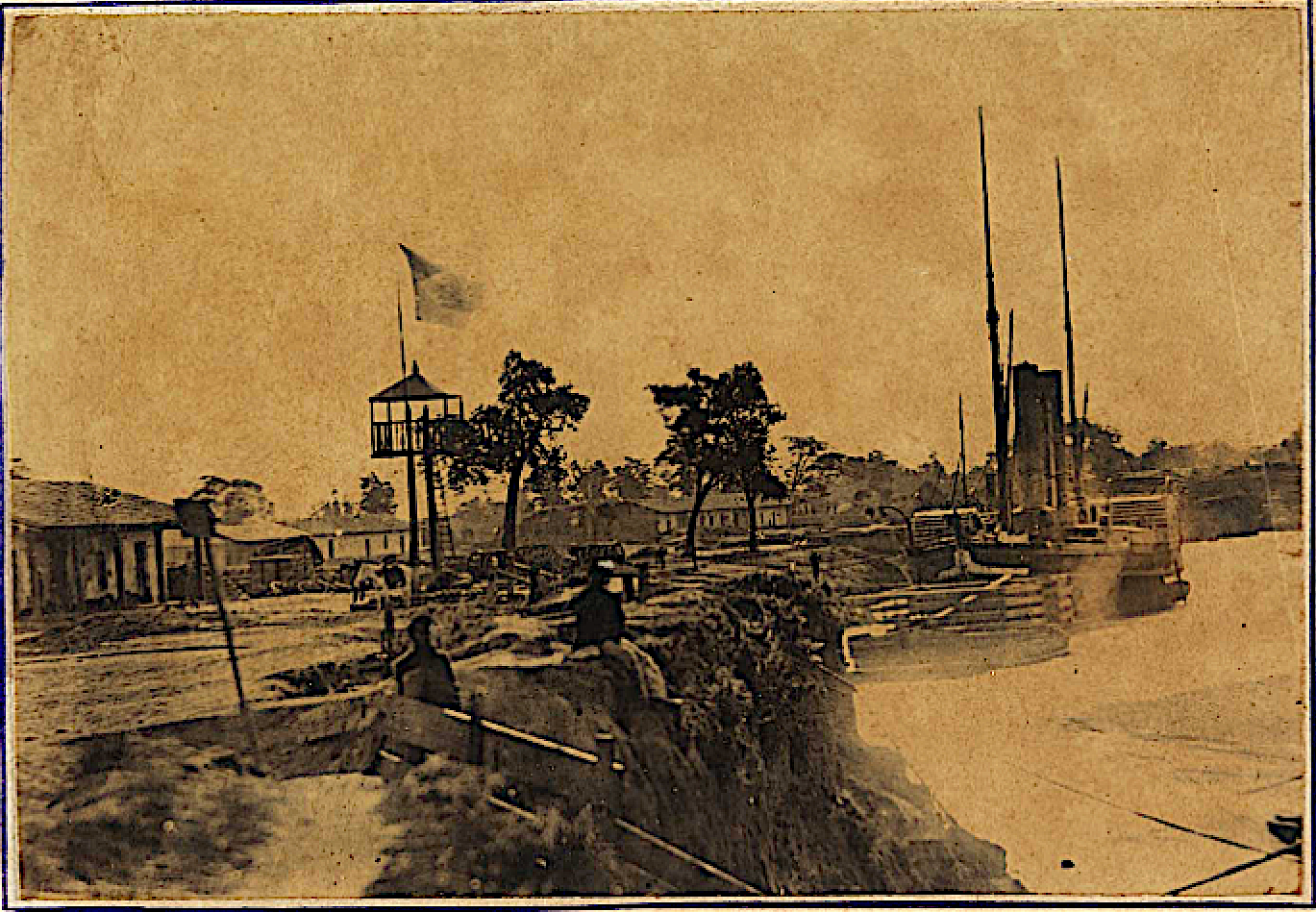
Brazilian flag over a ravine in Humaitá after its capture

Some of Barroso's crew came out on deck to greet the army troops at Tagy as the battleship approached the ravine. Recklessly, the infantry there confused the crew with Paraguayans still trying to attack them and fired a volley, injuring four sailors and killing two others, being the only deaths on the ship. The confusion appears to be without justification, since at the time there was "light that night due to the effect of the moon", according to the Artur Silveira da Mota's account. Total Brazilian casualties were 11, three killed (two by friendly fire) and eight wounded due to injuries caused by projectiles, blades and other objects. There is no exact number among the Paraguayans. Writer and general Paulo de Queiroz Duarte, in his book The Volunteers of the Homeland in the Paraguay War, Vol. 3, states that 42 corpses remained in the awning of Barroso. It is likely that those who were lying in the river were also added to this number, as well as 32 prisoners who tried to escape by swimming and through the woods, totaling a probable 74 casualties. (Note: Donato states that the entire Paraguayan expedition had been exterminated without causing major damage to the vessels. Rio Branco says that few Paraguayans survived.) In addition, 12 canoes, 40 oars, 29 hand grenades, nine congreve rockets, four incendiary tubes, eight carbines, seven spears, ten swords, 12 mixed sails, five boarding croques, a sword and a cartridge case.

== Aftermath ==
The defeat of the Paraguayans allowed the allies to prepare to take the fortress of Humaitá. About ten days after the battle, Imperial troops reinforced the Chaco and consequently opened the way for the transposition of the fortress by three more Imperial ships. One of the Paraguayan prisoners that took part in the assault indicated the defensive positions in the Tebicuary region, resulting in the transposition of three battleships on them and subsequent bombing of the bogavantes training site. On 24 July, Humaitá was finally abandoned by its last defenders, it was then occupied by troops under the command of the Marquis of Caxias the following day.

The remaining fleeing forces were found and cornered by the Brazilians on Isla Poí, towards the Chaco. Even at a disadvantage, the Paraguayans offered fierce combat in canoea and only surrendered with the arrival of Imperial army troops garrisoned at Timbó, which took place on 5 August. The assault attempt on 9 July was the third undertaken by the Paraguayans until that point, and a fourth one took place the following year, during the Campaign of the Hills.
