= Cesáreo Domínguez =

Argentine general (1808–1867)

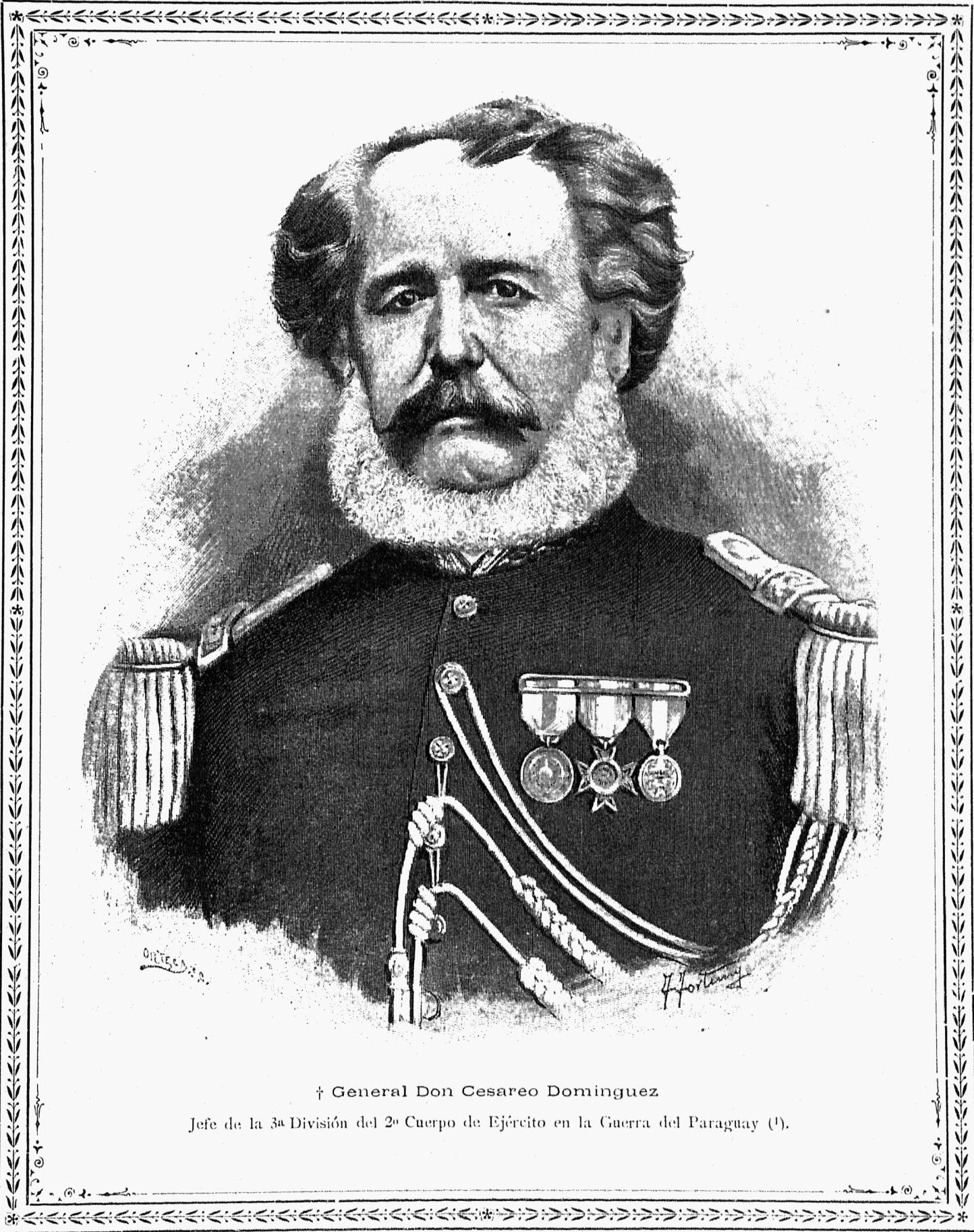
- Born: 1808; San Juan, San Juan Province, Río de la Plata, Spain
- Died: October 9, 1867 (aged 58–59); Tuyutí, Ñeembucú Department, Paraguay
- Military career
- Allegiance: Federal Party; State of Buenos Aires; Argentina
- Branch: Argentine Army
- Service years: 1820s – 1867
- Rank: General
- Conflicts: List: Argentine Civil Wars; Battle of Oncativo; Battle of Chascomús; Battle of Quebracho Herrado; Battle of Sancala; Battle of Rodeo del Medio; Battle of Arroyo Grande; Battle of San Antonio; Battle of Caseros; Siege of Buenos Aires; Battle of San Gregorio; Battle of Cepeda; Battle of Las Playas; Uruguayan Civil War; Great Siege of Montevideo; Paraguayan War; Humaitá campaign; Battle of Paso de Patria; Battle of Itapirú; Battle of Estero Bellaco; Battle of Tuyutí; Battle of Yataytí Corá; Battle of Boquerón; Battle of Curupaytí; Battle of Tuyú Cué †

Cesáreo Domínguez (1808 – October 9, 1867) was an Argentine Federalist general. He was an active participant in the Argentine Civil Wars and the Paraguayan War before his death at the Battle of Tuyú Cué from a cholera outbreak.

== Biography ==
Domínguez was born in 1808 at San Juan as the son of Mateo Antonio Domínguez and María Josefa Jofré.

After minor participation in the Argentine Civil Wars since 1822, he was possibly part of the forces that, under the command of José Félix Aldao, fought in the Battle of Oncativo, and traveled to the Buenos Aires Provinces.

In 1831, he campaigned against the Unitarian League under orders of Juan Ramón Balcarce, reaching the rank of officer. The following year he joined the garrison of San Miguel del Monte, in the province of Buenos Aires, where he married Antonia Maestre, and served for several years on the western border of that province. He fought under Prudencio Rosas at the Battle of Chascomús in 1839.

In 1840, he campaigned inland, in the ranks of Manuel Oribe's army, and fought in the battles of Quebracho Herrado, Sancala, Rodeo del Medio, and Arroyo Grande.

For the next eight years he was commander of the Patricios del Monte battalion, participating in the Great Siege of Montevideo. He participated in the recovery of the town of Salto and in the Battle of San Antonio against the redshirts of the mercenary Giuseppe Garibaldi, under the orders of General Servando Gómez. During the battle, Domínguez's service was credited as heroic and earned his promotion lieutenant colonel as he garrisoned Salto, protecting it from enemy attacks.

Upon Justo José de Urquiza's invasion of Uruguay and the surrender of the besieging troops, many senior Argentine officers withdrew to Buenos Aires except for Domínguez. A few days later, three officers who should have been incorporated into the Ejército Grande of Urquiza, Domínguez, Julián Martínez and Domingo Sosa, fled to Buenos Aires and presented themselves to Juan Manuel de Rosas. They then fought orders under Rosas at the Battle of Caseros. Urquiza placed Domínguez under a bounty but Domínguez managed to take refuge on a British ship with Governor Vicente López y Planes declaring it outlawed.

Despite all these antecedents, in July he was reincorporated into the Army of the State of Buenos Aires. He opposed the Revolution of 11 September 1852 but when he finally recognized the authorities of the State of Buenos Aires, they promoted him to the rank of colonel. When General Hilario Lagos rose up against the separatist government and began the Siege of Buenos Aires, he represented the Buenos Aires government in the signing of an agreement with the Federalist general but the government itself ignored. A few days later, he joined Lagos' army and fought in the Battle of San Gregorio.

When the battle ended in a loss, he retired to his house in San Miguel del Monte. In 1854, Governor Adolfo Alsina ordered for his arrest, accusing him of supporting the invasion of General Jerónimo Costa but Domínguez managed to flee to the Entre Ríos Province.

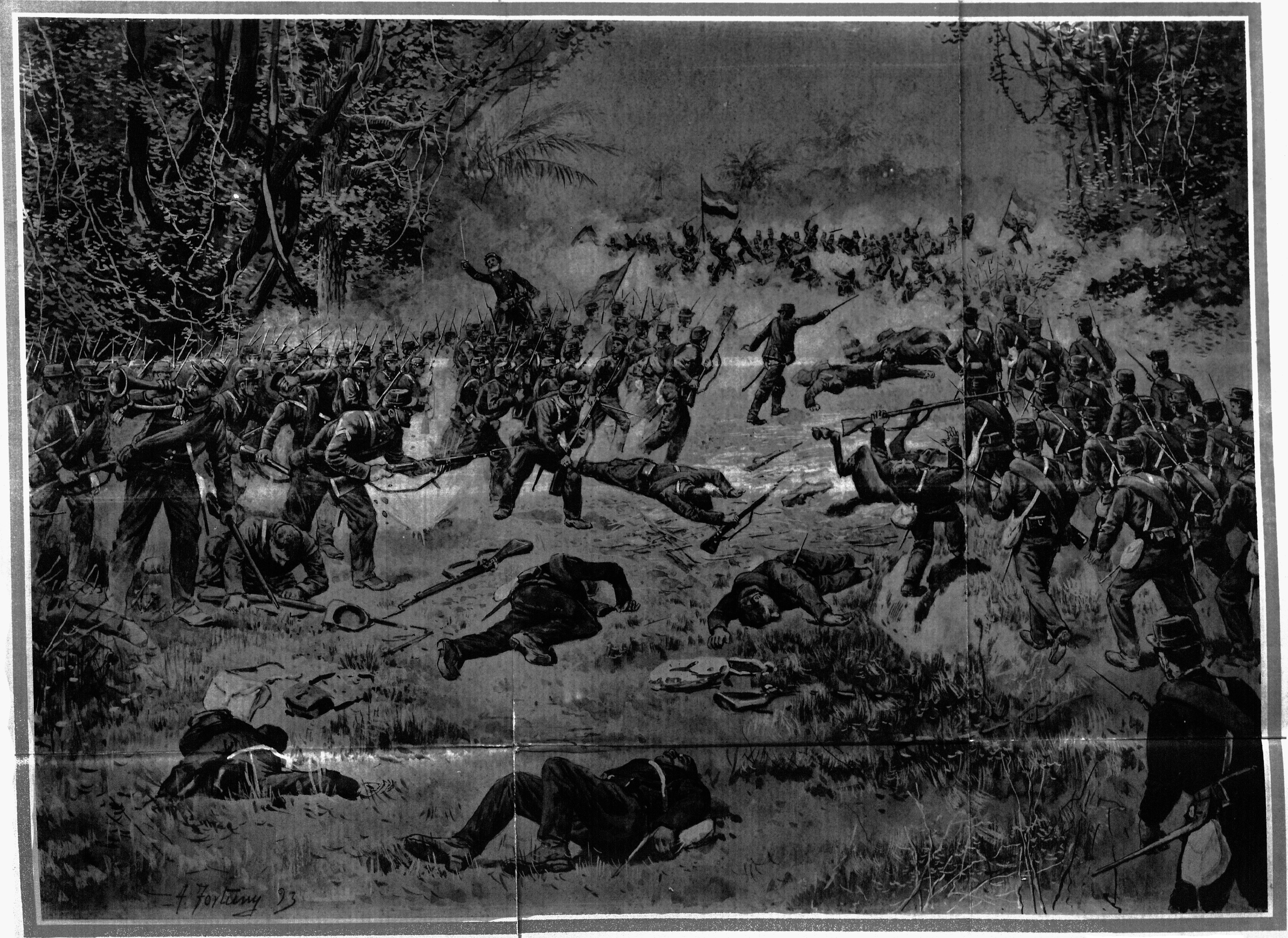
Attack of the 3rd Division of the 2nd Army Corps under the command of Colonel D. Cesáreo Dominguez during the Battle of Boquerón.

In 1855, he was interim general inspector of the Army of the Argentine Confederation and the following year, a comptroller of the San Juan Province, a position he never assumed. For several months he was interim minister of war during the absence of General José Miguel Galán. He became acting minister again during the campaigns of the Battle of Cepeda.

He was appointed military commander and political head of the Concordia Department in the northeast of Entre Ríos.

In early 1864, he was incorporated into the Argentine Army and as inspector of the borders of Córdoba and San Luis. On June 10, he was taken prisoner by the revolution led by Simón Luengo and sentenced to death at the instigation of Calixto González in the absence of Chacho Peñaloza. However, after the Battle of Las Playas, he was released by Colonel Ambrosio Sandes.

The following year he organized the Cordovan contingents that were to participate in the Paraguayan War. He marched to the frontlines and under the orders of Emilio Mitre, he had an outstanding performance in the battles of Paso de Patria, Itapirú, Estero Bellaco, Tuyutí, Yataytí Corá, Boquerón and Curupaytí.

On July 18, 1867, he was promoted to the rank of general, and the following month he assumed command of the first army corps. While commanding the corps, he was the head of the Battle of Tuyú Cué, during which he fell ill with cholera. He died in Tuyú Cué, Ñeembucú, on October 9, 1867, aged 58 or 59.

His son, also called Cesáreo Domínguez, was also a military figure and reached the rank of sergeant major.
