= Battle of Yacaré =

- Part of the Pikysyry campaign
| Date | August 26, 1868 |
| Location | Yacaré stream, Ñeembucú, Paraguay |
| Result | Brazilian victory |

Belligerents
| Empire of Brazil | Paraguay |

Commanders and leaders
| João Niederauer Sobrinho | José Matias Bado |

Strength
| 800 cavalrymen | 200 cavalrymen |

Casualties and losses
| 80 casualties | 76 dead 5 captured |

The Battle of Yacaré was a battle fought in August 26, 1868, by Brazilian and Paraguayan forces during the Paraguayan War, part of the beginning of the Pikysyry campaign. It was a Brazilian victory.

The allied army had only weeks before concluded operations around the Fortress of Humaitá and begun to advance north towards Asunción, the Paraguayan capital. This battle was one of the first fought during this movement, an assault and capture of a defensive fieldwork which lay on the way to the Paraguayan headquarters at the Pikysyry line.

== Engagement ==
As operations in Paraguay resumed after a lull of a few weeks following the end of the long siege of Humaitá, the allied army started to push north towards the new Paraguayan positions, much closer to Asunción. Between Humaitá and these positions the Paraguayan forces posted an advance detachment of 200 men under captain José Matias Bado in a fortification over the Yacaré stream, close to other defensive emplacements on the Tebicuary river.

When Bado saw the full allied army advancing, he ordered a withdrawal, which was stopped by skirmishers and then a charge by colonel Niederauer's 6th Provincial Cavalry Corps, 800 men strong. Both sides suffered a similar number of casualties before the remainder of the Paraguayan force managed to withdraw to the main defensive line.
