= Miguel Martínez de Hoz =

Argentine colonel (1832–1868)

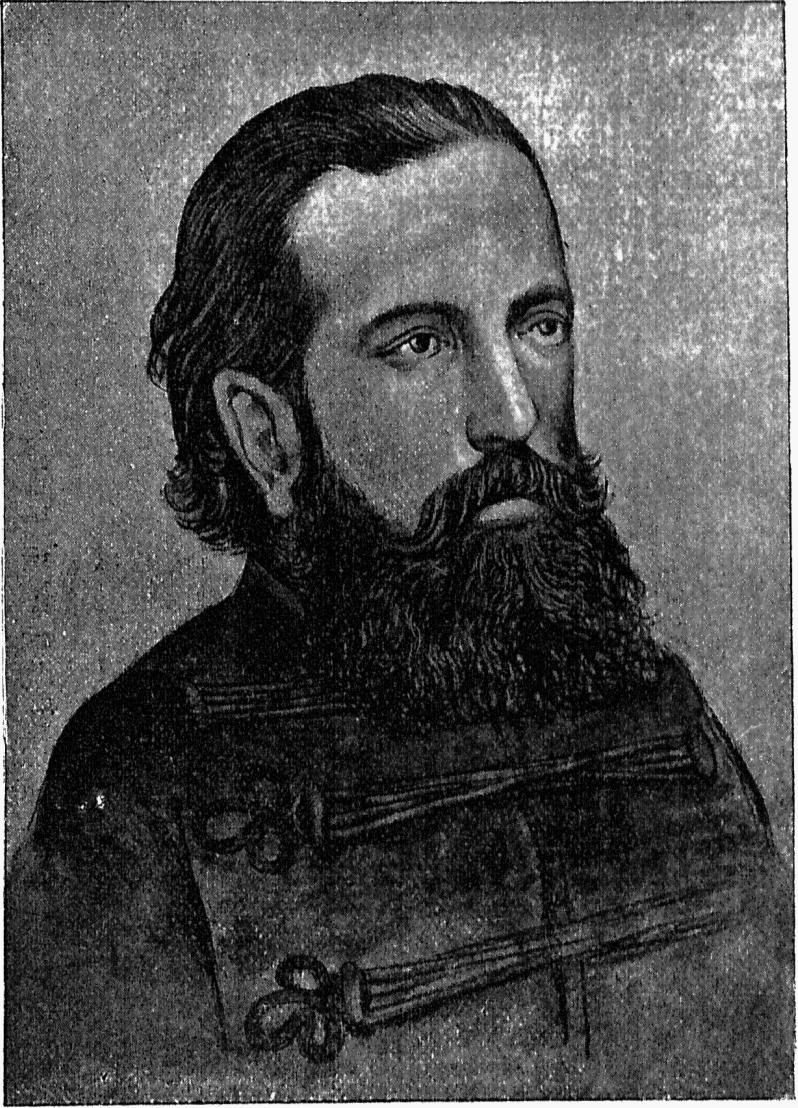
- Born: 1832; Buenos Aires, Buenos Aires Province, Argentine Confederation
- Died: 1868 (aged 36); Acayuazú, Paraguay
- Military career
- Allegiance: Argentina
- Branch: Argentine Army
- Service years: 1852 — 1868
- Rank: Coronel
- Conflicts: Argentine Civil Wars; Battle of Caseros; Paraguayan War; Corrientes campaign; Battle of Yatay; Siege of Uruguaiana; Humaitá campaign; Battle of Paso de Patria; Battle of Tuyutí; Battle of Acayuazá †

Miguel Florencio Martínez de Hoz (1832 – 1868) was a 19th-century Argentine Colonel. He was known for his involvement in the Campaigns prior to the Conquest of the Desert and in the Paraguay War, the latter of which he was killed in action in the Battle of Acayuazá.

== Biography ==
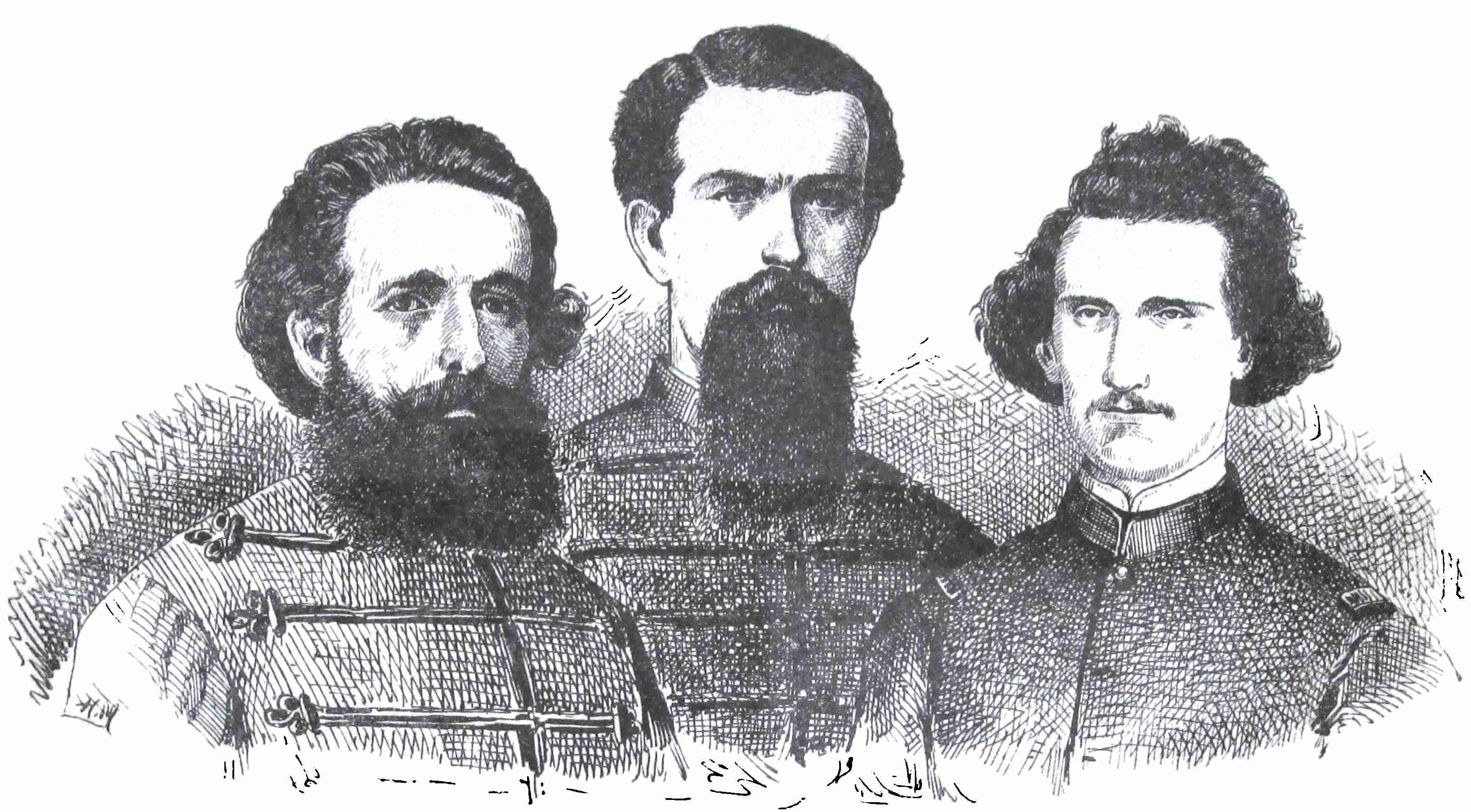
Comandantes Martinez de Hoz, Serrano and Carlos Keen.

The son of a powerful rancher and merchant, he always wrote his name and signed as Miguel Martínez, but his bosses and subordinates cited him as "Martínez de Hoz". After attending only primary studies, he dedicated himself to managing family invitations.

He enlisted in the provincial army shortly after the Battle of Caseros, in the frontier corps with Native Americans. He fought in the Battle of San Gregorio, in which the Unitarians were defeated by the Federalists from the interior of the Buenos Aires Province, and participated in the defense of the city during the Siege of Buenos Aires.

He was discharged in mid- 1853, to dedicate himself fully to his stay and the exploitation of a salting room together with the French chemist Antonio Cambaceres . He settled in Lobería, where he dedicated himself to cattle ranching and race horse breeding. He was justice of the peace of Lobería, and in 1859 he was appointed military commander of Lobería. In the fight against the indigenous people, he always stood out for his courage and firmness in the face of danger. When the Battle of Cepeda ended in defeat, his militiamen revolted, but he managed to reduce them.

In the campaign that would lead to the Battle of Pavón, he organized a large contingent of militiamen, with whom he covered almost the entire southern border, while the line troops carried out the campaign against the Argentine Confederation. Shortly after, he was promoted to the rank of lieutenant colonel and placed in command of the South Coast border line.

At the outbreak of the Paraguayan War, he presented himself as a volunteer to President Bartolomé Mitre, who appointed him Colonel of the National Guards that consisted of militia troops. During the Battle of Paso de Patria, coinciding with the beginning of the invasion of Paraguay, he was seriously wounded, so that he spent many months inactive. He rejoined in time for the Battle of Tuyutí, in which he was also wounded. From the hospital where he was recovering was sent to confront the federal of Cuyo, but they were defeated before Martinez entered combat.

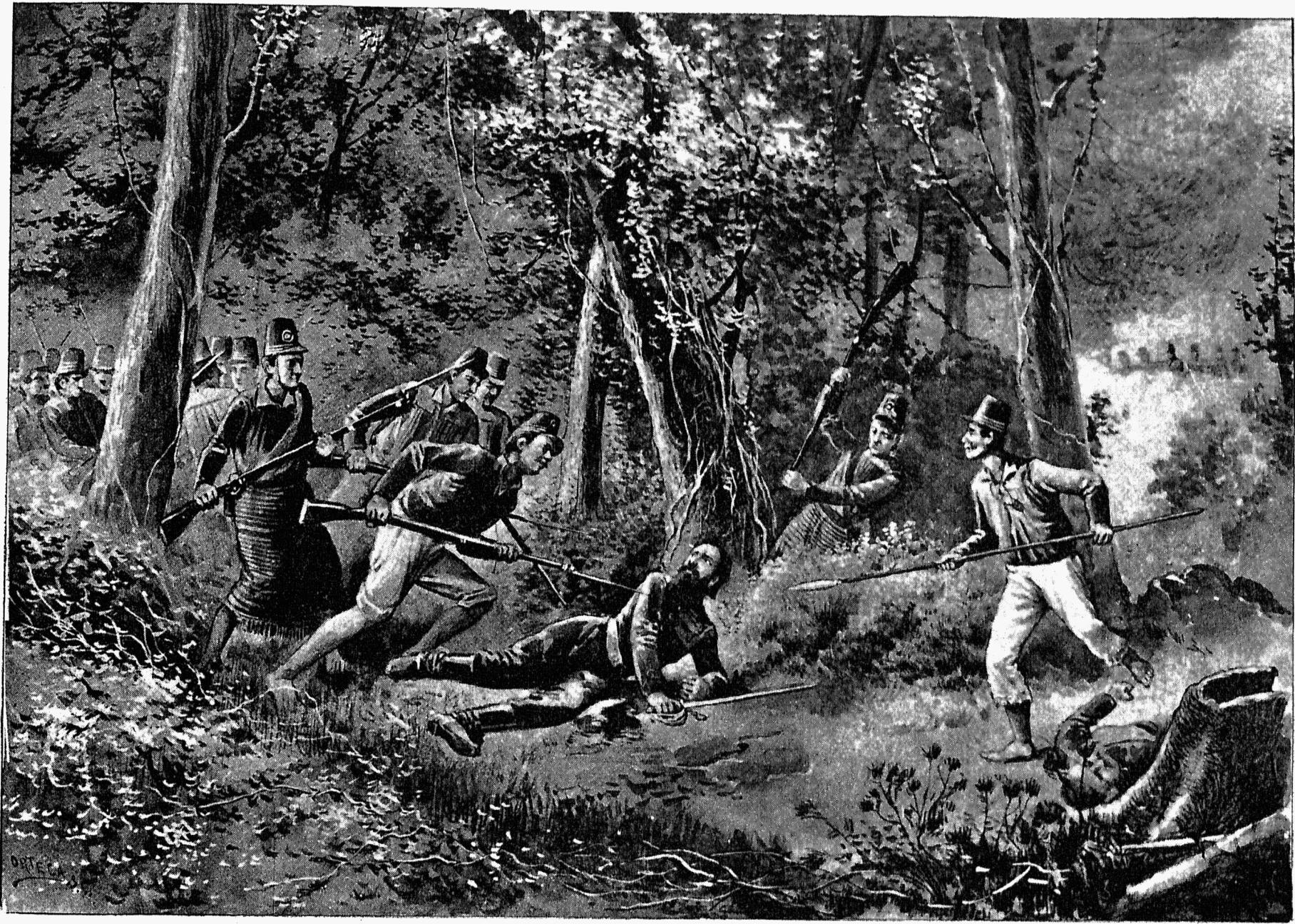
Death of Colonel Martinez de Hoz in Acayuazú.

He fought in Yatay, Uruguaiana, Pehuajó and Paso de Patria. In the last battle he was seriously wounded; had to spend a long time inactive. He rejoined for the Battle of Tuyutí, where he was wounded again. From the hospital he was sent to the campaign against the federals of Cuyo, but he did not go into combat.

He returned to the front after the Battle of Curupayty and participated in the capture of the Humaitá Fortress. In all these battles he stood out as an example of courage and even recklessness.

At the beginning of the offensive on Asunción, his battalion and that of Colonel Gaspar Campos were assigned to watch over the Timbó battery, under the command of colonel Bernardino Caballero (later President of Paraguay) in a place called Acayuazá (also known in Argentine historiography as Reducto-Cue). When they tried to take it, they fell into an ambush by Caballero in July 1868, killing more than half of the Argentines, including Colonel Martínez de Hoz. Caballero wore his watch until the end of the war, after which he passed it on to the hero's family. The same deal had with the effects of Colonel Gaspar Campos, who in that action was taken prisoner and died weeks later of dysentery in Lomas Valentinas, assisted by him.
