= Assault of Paso Cidra =

Part of the Paraguayan War

- Part of the Humaitá campaign
Date	May 20, 1866
Location	Estero Bellaco, Paraguay
Result	Brazilian victory

Belligerents
Empire of Brazil	Paraguay

Commanders and leaders
Vanderlei Lins	Avelino Cabral

The Assault of Paso Cidra was an allied military operation during the Paraguayan War, which took place on May 20, 1866, in Estero Bellaco, Paraguay. The action consisted of the assault by Brazilian forces of the 2nd Infantry Battalion, under the command of Vanderlei Lins, subordinate of Uruguayan general Venâncio Flores, to a Paraguayan entrenched position, defended by men of Lieutenant Colonel Avelino Cabral. The operation was successful, with taking the position and clearing the path for the Allied march.
