= Battle of Acayuazá =

1868 battle of the Paraguayan War

- Part of the Humaitá campaign
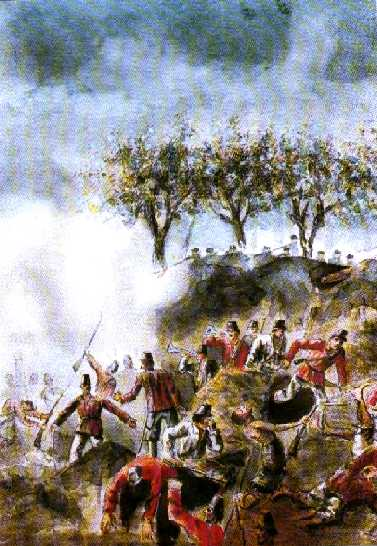
- Battle of Acaguazá in the Chaco
Date	July 18, 1868
Location	Reduto-Corá, Paraguay
Result	Paraguayan victory

Belligerents
Paraguay	Argentina; Empire of Brazil

Commanders and leaders
Bernardino Caballero	Martínez de Hoz †

Strength
500 soldiers	1,500 soldiers (Argentines and Brazilians)

Casualties and losses
100 casualties	400 dead (all Argentinians)

The Battle of Acayuazá was fought on July 18, 1868, on the outskirts of Reduto-Corá between the allied troops of the Triple Alliance and the Paraguayan army. Despite being outnumbered, the Paraguayan troops prevailed over the allies.

== The battle ==
On the morning of July 18 the allied troops advanced to the front in two parallel columns, with the obvious purpose of taking over the Paraguayan bunker at Reduto-Corá. The allied force consisted of the 3rd Argentine Riojano Battalion and two Brazilian battalions, led by Colonel Miguel Martínez de Hoz.

The Argentine battalion marched ahead. The Paraguayans attacked them, then retreated and lured the Argentines to the stronghold, as planned.

The Argentine troops pushed forward, reaching an area where the Paraguayans scattered. This left the allies within strike range of the Reduto-Corá artillery, which suddenly erupts in a volley of gunfire. It was too late for an orderly withdrawal; the Brazilians were routed and fled, but the Argentines were surrounded by the regrouping Paraguayan forces. Argentine Colonel Miguel Martínez de Hoz was killed in combat, along with 400 Argentines soldiers.
