= Battle of Itapirú =

Part of the Paraguayan War

- Part of the Humaitá campaign
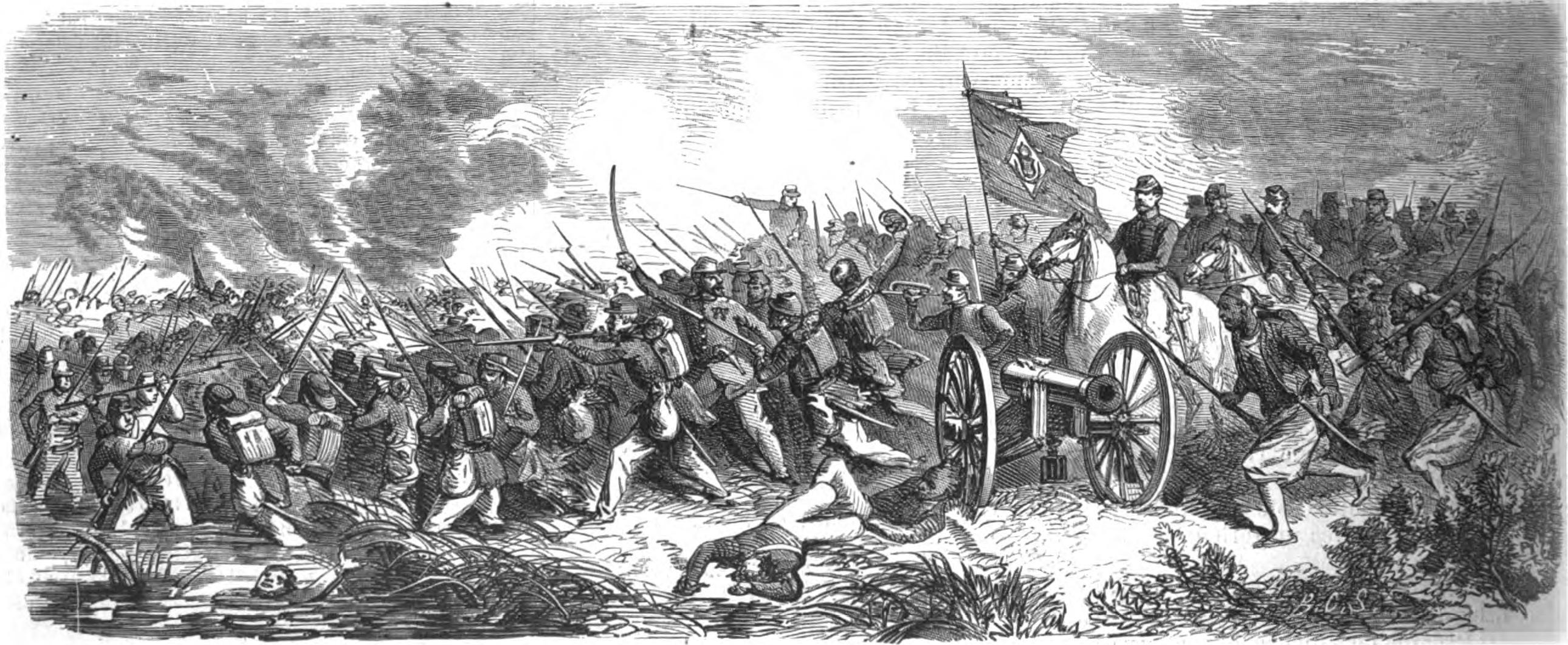
- The Battle of Itapirú, won by the Brazilians, under the command of Marshal Osório
Date	April 17, 1866
Location	Laguna Sirena, Passo da Patria, Paraguay
Result	Brazilian victory

Belligerents
Empire of Brazil	Paraguay

Commanders and leaders
Manuel Luís Osório	Basílio Benitez

Strength
10,000 soldiers	4,000 soldiers

Casualties and losses
337 casualties	500 casualties

The Battle of Itapirú took place during the Paraguayan War on April 17, 1866, after Brazil's capture of Purutué Bank a week earlier. The battle marked the beginning of the Triple Alliance's invasion of Paraguay.

== The Battle ==
On April 16, the Itapirú fort was heavily bombed by the Imperial Navy while 10,000 troops from the Imperial Army crossed the Paraná River, and the next day, the confrontation with 4,000 Paraguayans took place under the command of Lieutenant Colonel Benítez, resulting in their withdrawal to Itapirú. The battle resulted in about 500 casualties on the Paraguayan side and 337 on the Brazilian side.

Faced with the concentration of Brazilian troops that began the invasion of Paraguayan territory, Francisco Solano López ordered the fortification abandoned, allowing Brazilian troops to occupy it on April 18.
