= Passage of Fortín Island =

- Part of the Humaitá campaign
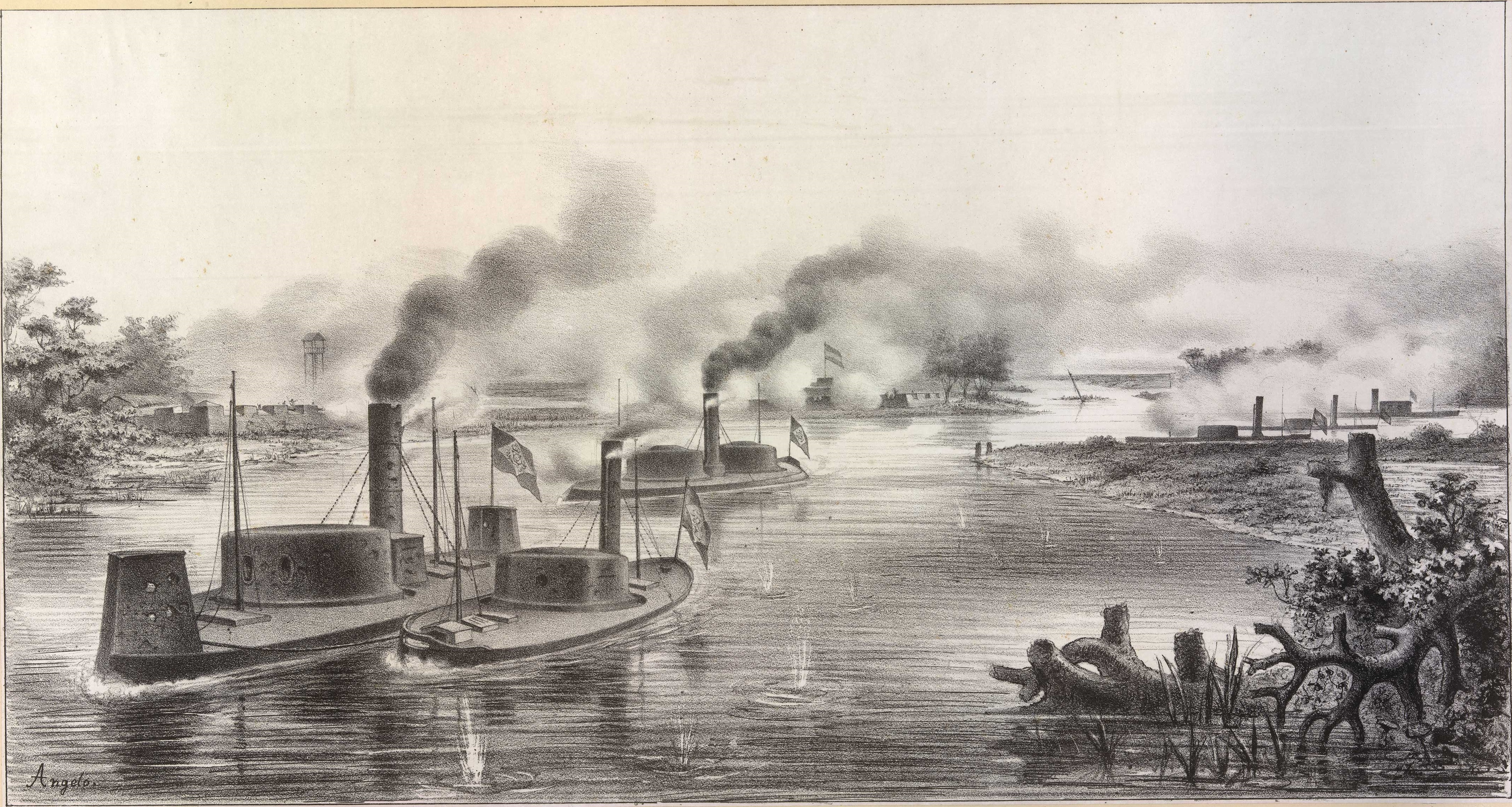
- The ironclads Bahia (left), Alagoas (right) and Silvado (rear) advancing against coastal batteries on the Tebicuary River on 23 July 1868 (illustration by Angelo Agostini published in A Vida Fluminense, No. 34, 1868)
Date	23–24 July 1868
Location	Fortín island, Paraguay River, Paraguay
Result	Brazilian victory

Belligerents
Empire of Brazil	Paraguay

Commanders and leaders
Delfim Carlos de Carvalho	George Thompson

Strength
3 ironclads	Unknown

Casualties and losses
8: 3 killed 5 wounded	Unknown

The Passage of Fortín Island consisted of the transposition carried out by a naval division of the Imperial Brazilian Navy - consisting of the ironclads Bahia and Silvado, and the monitor Alagoas - against a Paraguayan fortified position located near the Fortress of Humaitá called Fortín Island, on the banks of the Paraguay River, on 24 July 1868, during the Paraguayan War. The passage was successfully completed, even under fire from the fortifications. At night, the Paraguayans left Fortín Island to Acayuazá and Isla Poí.

== Background ==
The Tebicuary River flows into the Paraguay River. The Paraguayans built fortifications near the mouth of the Tebicuary to prevent the entry of Brazilian ships and, consequently, to prevent the capture of Paraguayan steamers that were located there and from the camp of San Fernando, which bordered the Tebicuary. The batteries of these fortifications consisted of seven eight-inch and two 32-pounder guns and, about 2,000 yards away, a barracks with two eight-inch and three 32-pounder guns, in addition to two rifled 32-pounder howitzers in order to prevent attempts to disembark in the region.

This position also kept allied forces from steaming up the Paraguay River and reaching the Paraguayan capital, Asunción. The British engineer Thompson, who served as an officer in the Paraguayan Army, narrates how, from late 1867 onwards, the position was fortified under his direction.

According to Hooker, the ironclads Bahia, Alagoas, Barroso and Rio Grande had already unsuccessfully attacked the batteries on the Tebicuary on the 10th of June. This event paved the way for the actions of the 23rd and 24th of July, given the inability of the Brazilian warships to completely silence the Paraguayan guns. At this phase of the war, the freedom of movement of these ships was almost complete, and "every morning" they would steam upriver towards the Paraguayan positions to engage them, returning before nightfall.

== First engagement ==
At 2:20 PM on 23 of July, the ironclads Bahia, Silvado and Alagoas arrived at the mouth of the Tebicuary. The following day, the vessels took their positions to effect the passage. Alagoas was berthed to Bahia with Silvado right behind, at a sufficient distance so that Bahia could maneuver and not be hindered in case there was a need to retreat. According to commander Delfim Carlos de Carvalho, these were the most suitable ships for the mission. The other ships of the squadron moved to the rear to provide fire support for the three ironclads.

Artur Silveira da Mota, commander of Barroso, narrated the crossing of the mouth of the Tebicuary, where they arrived at 2:20 PM on 23 July:

"we anchored the three moorings a little further down the Tebicuary; the other two ships anchored on the shores of the Chaco; everyone let go of the monitors, and these, closer to the battery, also anchored; during the rest of the day it was a relentless bombardment and, as a rule, during the night, every quarter of an hour, we fired our shot [...] the following morning Bahia with a monitor tied to the port side and Silvado went upriver at full speed.”

Executing the passage, the Brazilian ironclads were attacked by several projectiles coming from the fortifications and, as in Curupayty and Humaitá, the ships had to steam at slow speed in order to get around the sudden turn of the river; this forced them to advance close to the batteries, which caused them much damage due to the close proximity of the enemy cannons. Despite the difficulties, the ironclads managed to dash past the defenses until they reached the bottom of a stream called Recodo which was a channel of the Paraguay River.

In that region, the ironclads saw the funnels of two Paraguayan steamers that were anchored in San Fernando, which, according to Brazilian officer Antônio Luís von Hoonholtz, commander of Bahia, was a huge encampment. Bahia positioned itself above the channel while Silvado was below. The role of Alagoas would be to protect the port side of Bahia by entering the channel, attacking the Paraguayan steamers and disrupting the camp, but the monitor had suffered a malfunction in its propulsion system that prevented it from carrying out the mission. In the words of von Hoonholtz: "two successive shots hit and shook this ship, causing frightening depressions and a lot of damage”; after advancing, still under fire from the first battery, they faced a second one. In Hoonholtz's report: "the second redoubt struck us by the bow while the 68-pounder cannons shook the battleship with their bullets full 12 fathoms away". Even so, the monitor fired from where it was towards the Paraguayan ships and the camp, causing the steamers crew to maneuver their ships in order to avoid the bombs that exploded above them.

Alagoas was berthed at Monte Lindo for one day for repairs; this prevented the ship to fulfill the role assigned to it by Delfim, commander of the Brazilian flotilla in Humaitá: after crossing the batteries, they reached a stream (actually a branch of the Paraguay River) called Recodo, where they sighted enemy vessels. Silvado should guard the lower part, Bahia the upper one, while Alagoas should enter the stream and sink the enemy ships, but the latter could not carry out the task, as its propulsion system was damaged; Delfim recorded about Alagoas: “I carried out a continuous bombardment directed at the place where you could see the smoke coming from the steamers, whose sides were hidden by an island that forms the creek, at the same time as the drivers on board helped by Silvado's crewmen took care of repairing the machine".

Finally, the Brazilian vessels steamed until the foliage hid them. At the end of this attack, Bahia returned from its position and Alagoas berthed to Bahia's starboard side. Both ships positioned themselves to return and again engage the Tebicuary batteries.

== Second engagement ==
The new engagement against the Paraguayan fortifications was more violent than the first passage. At 4:00 PM on 24 July, in the same original formation, the passage began, with Alagoas moored to the starboard side of Bahia. Together with Silvado, they left to face the Paraguayan ships, supported by a strong army contingent on land. At 4:10 Bahia suffered an intense bombardment in which it lost its pilot; damaged, Bahia could steam only because it had two propellers that operated at different speeds; so, in order to prevent the ironclads from being boarded by the Paraguayans, a man known as the "old Picardo", a pilot from Alagoas, who had maneuvered Bahia to a safe position there, was summoned through an acoustic tube for communication between the ships, after suffering severe human and material losses.

Hoonholtz's report followed: "at 04:10 we faced the upper redoubt which received us with a horrible fire from its batteries at close range, causing the most serious damage this time and immediately killing the brave and distinguished pilot, second lieutenant Luiz Reppeto and a man at the helm, seriously injuring another”.

From this episode, the doubt of the existence of floating mines on the Paraguayan side remained; Hoonholtz recorded: "Bahia gallantly continued her march, always sheltering in her shadow the friendly and memorable Alagoas, with which we crossed at full strength and without novelty the stakes and the mysterious line of torpedoes, (Note: Floating mines.) whose existence sergeant Assencio Pereira still persists to attest". Also in Hoonholtz's account, they faced a chain boom placed across the river by English engineers and he would have counted on Alagoas' propulsion, combined with Bahia, to force the passage by ramming the chain, but this gave no result. It was only achieved after having ordered the bombardment of the spot on the river bank that held the chain, which was then finally broken, so that Alagoas could maneuver; this fact, however, is not recorded by Alagoas' officer.

According to Thompson, who was in command of the Paraguayan battery, the Brazilian ships were first engaged at "great range", and then the Paraguayans held their fire so that each gun in the battery could fire upon the enemy ships at a perpendicular angle. The ships first came about in direction of the guns, and then switched course to the opposite shore of the river. They only managed to, however, accrue a distance of 18 yards between themselves and the guns when they fired, and all shots were hits. "Most of them" [the cannon shot] "shattered into a thousand pieces", but some "caused great damage", and a 10 inches long plate of the Bahia's armor landed near the battery, such was the force of the hit against it. The ships continued upriver. This was, however, the only time they passed by the battery.

== Consequences ==
For the first time since the beginning of its campaign in Paraguay, Bahia's armor did not resist the projectiles of the Paraguayan artillery. A 68 caliber shot pierced the ships' turret and killed an officer and wounded two other crewmen. Another projectile pierced the ironclad on the side, causing much damage to it. In total, there were 16 impacts, four of which pierced the vessel. The Bahia would still help the Imperial Brazilian Army cross the Tebicuary some days later. Silvado, in turn, suffered major damage to the hull above the water, with some perforations. In the end, there were three dead and five wounded among the three vessels.

From the 26th to the 28th of August, the Paraguayan position on the Tebicuary was bombarded by the Brazilian ships, and on the 28th the Brazilian Army reached the position. Between that day and the next, said position was abandoned, with a loss of a large quantity of ammunition, in favor of the Pikysyry line. It would be around the latter position that the final battles of the regular phase of the War would be fought, in the Pikysyry campaign.
