= Battle of Purutué Bank =

Battle of the Paraguayan War

- Part of the Humaitá campaign
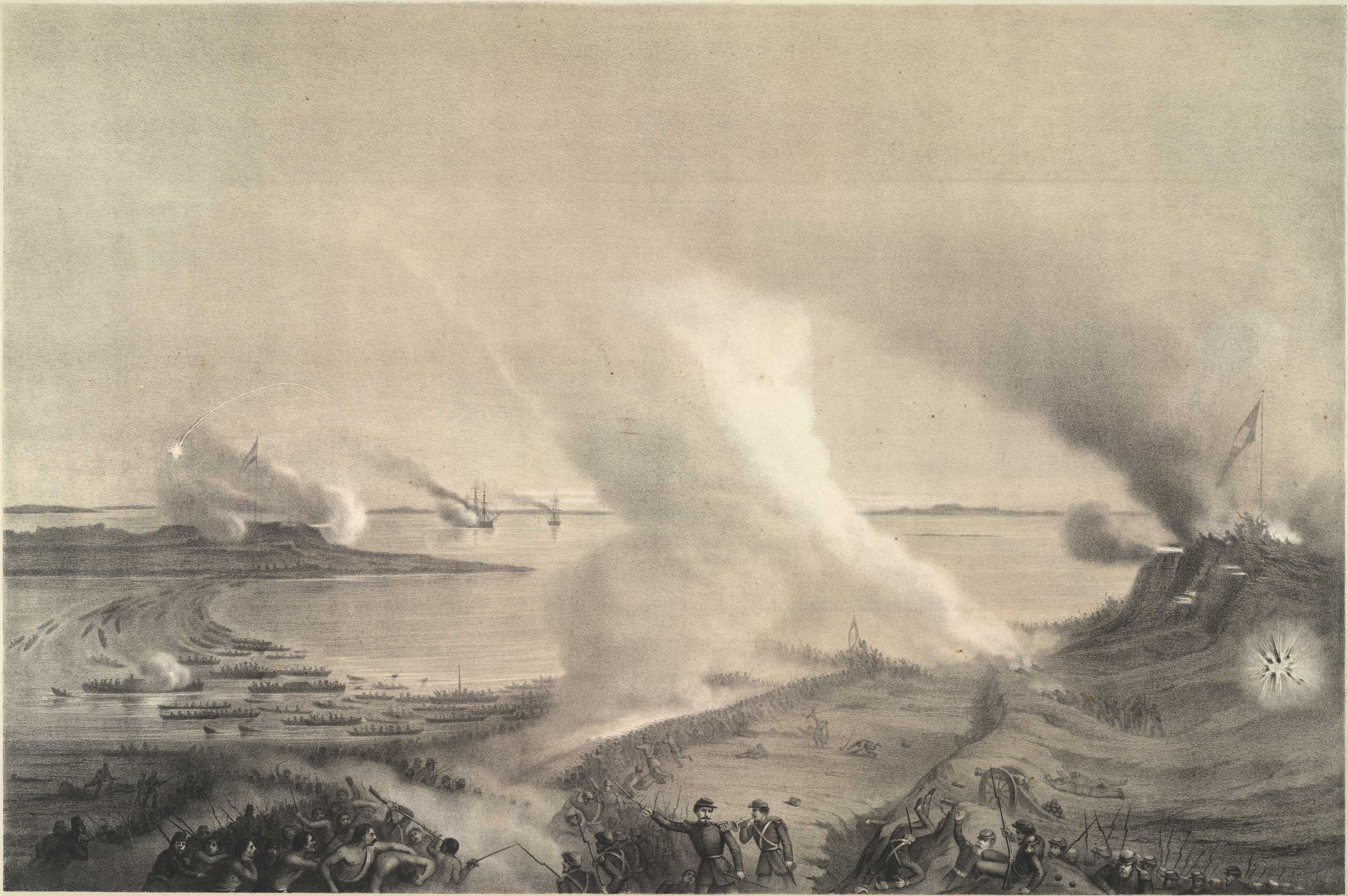
- Attack on Redemption Island
Date	10 April 1866
Location	Redenção Island, Paraná River, Argentina
Result	Brazilian victory

Belligerents
Paraguay	Empire of Brazil

Commanders and leaders
José E. Díaz; Leonardo Riveros	Villagran Cabrita †

Strength
1,266 soldiers	900 soldiers

Casualties and losses
900 dead	100 dead

The Battle of Purutué Bank (also called Redemption Island, Itapirú Bank, Carvalho Island, Cabrita Island or Vitória Island) took place on 10 April 1866, during the Paraguayan War.

== Preparation ==
Almost in the middle of the Paraná River, bordering the Itapirú fort, there was an island - in fact a sand bank - covered by vast grassland, which would later be called Ilha da Redenção, Ilha de Carvalho or Ilha do Cabrita. The Imperial Brazilian Army decided to occupy the island, important for its position in relation to the fort and the enemy camp, to serve as a point of support against the Paraguayans. On 5 April 1866, lieutenant colonel of engineers José Carlos de Carvalho was ordered to ship a 12-inch La Hitte battery and a 4-inch mortar, in addition to the corresponding material to cover them. The garrison of the island, composed of the aforementioned batteries, 100 soldiers of the Battalion of Engineers, the 7th infantry battalion of Fatherland Volunteers and the 14th Battalion of the National Guard, was commanded by lieutenant colonel João Carlos de Villagran Cabrita.

== The Battle ==
At 4 am on 10 April 1866, a Paraguayan force landed on the island trying to dislodge the Brazilian troops from their position. They were repelled with great losses and withdrew under the fire of the Brazilian fleet, which, in turn, was forced to withdraw before the fire of the Itapirú fort.

Colonel Villagran Cabrita was killed by a bomb fired from the Itapirú fort when, aboard a boat that contained ammunition for the island's garrison, he dictated the victory report. His name was given to the island.

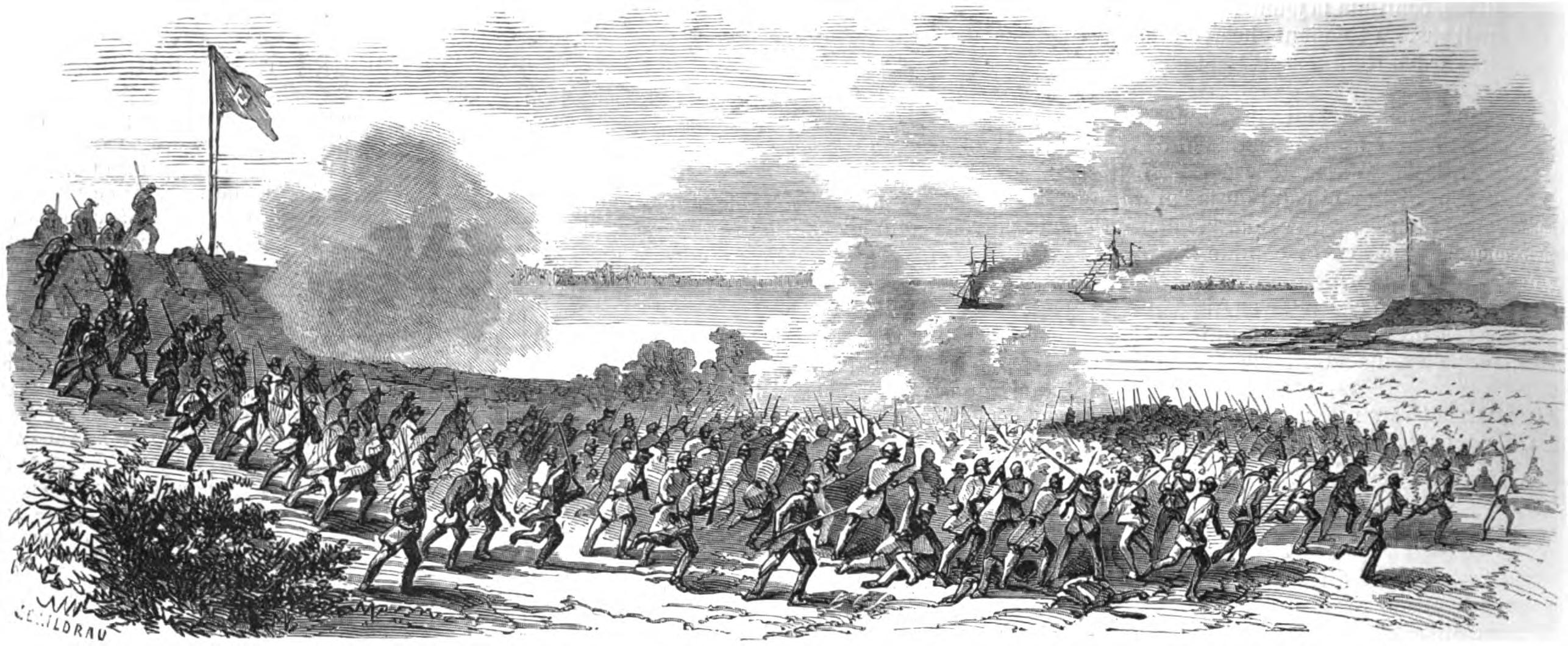
Combat of Ilha da Redenção, on the Paraná River (April 10, 1866): the 19th Brazilian Brigade repels the Paraguayan assault.

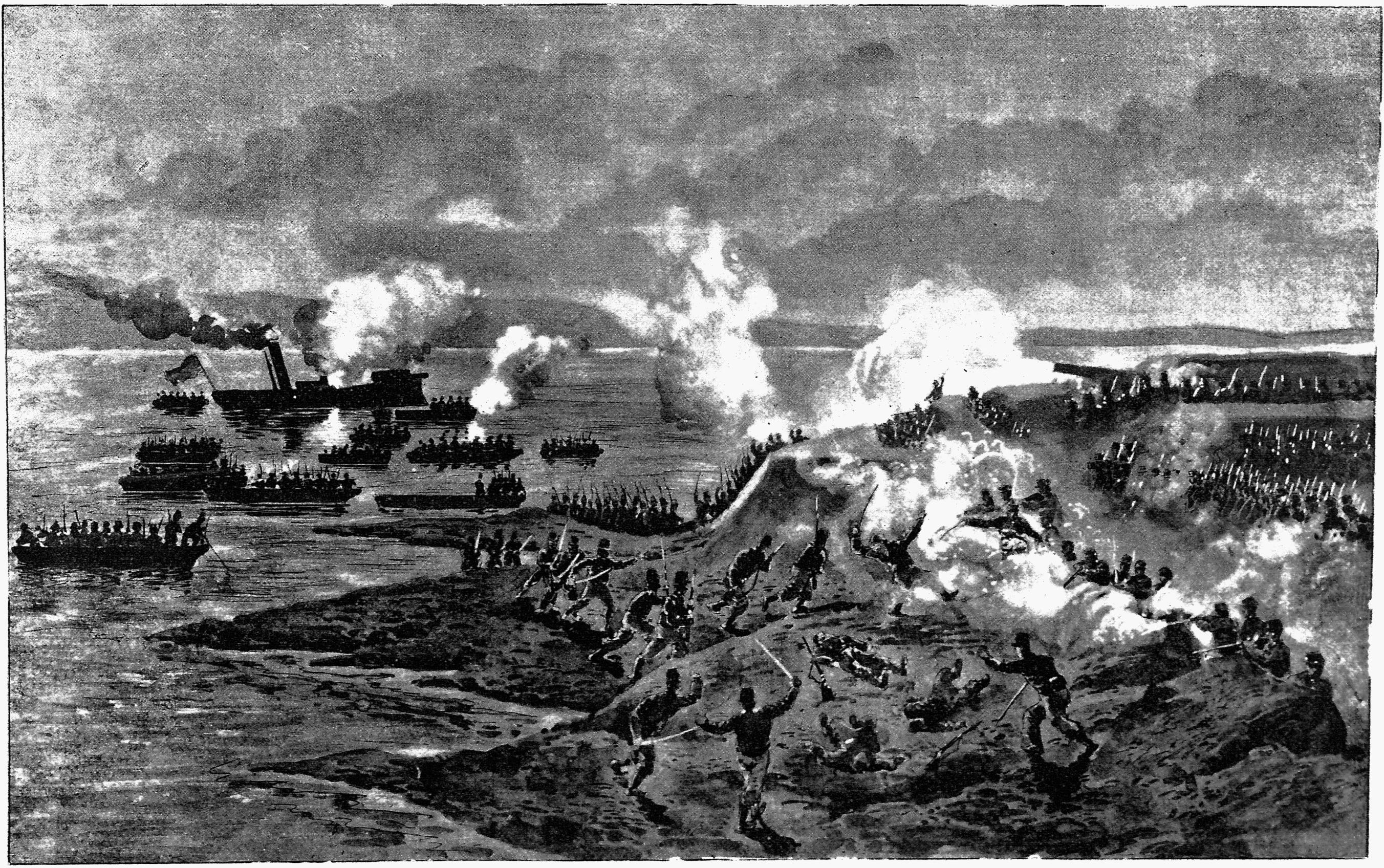
Paraguayan attack on Carayá Island.

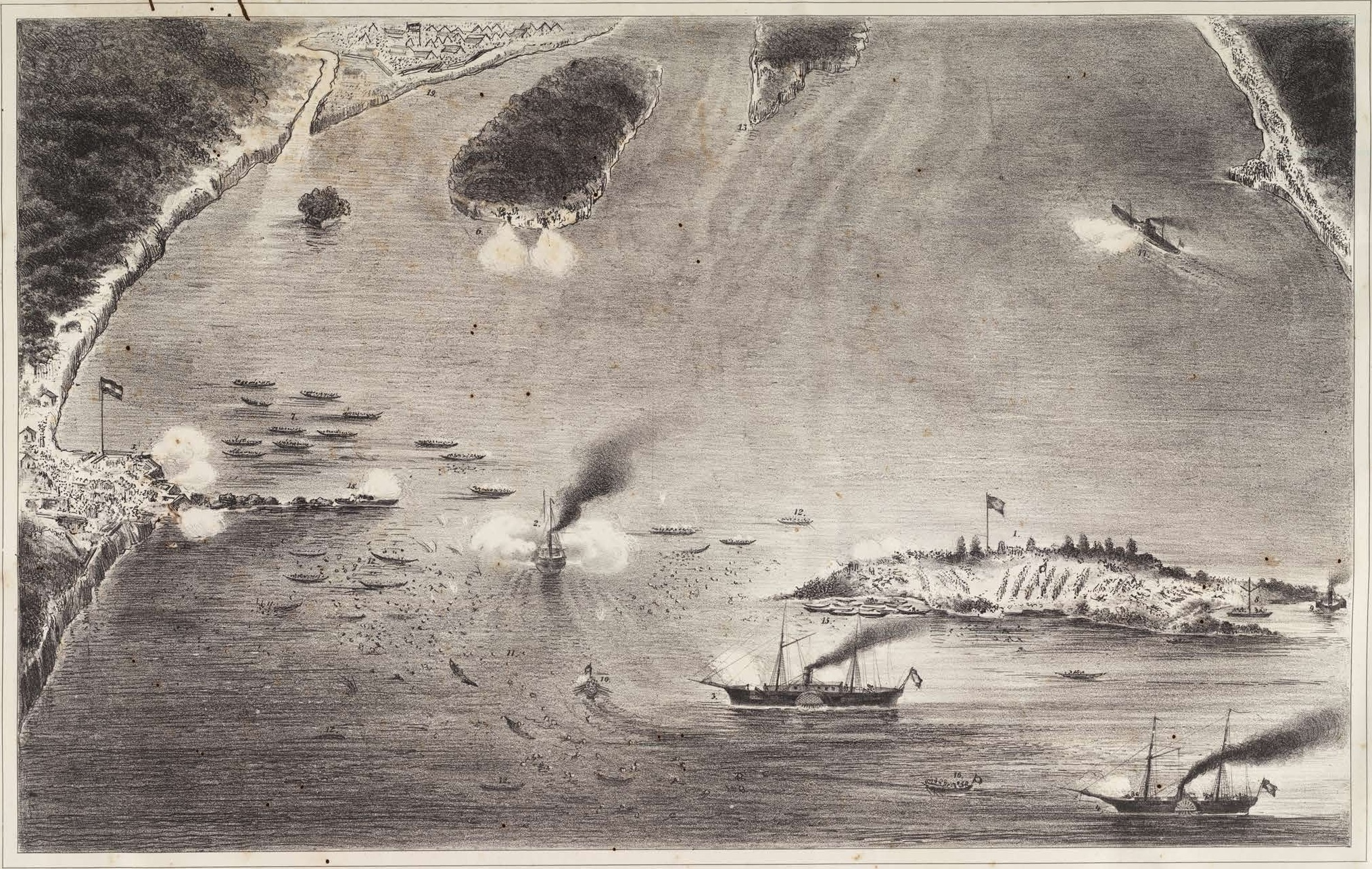
Attack on Carvalho Island.

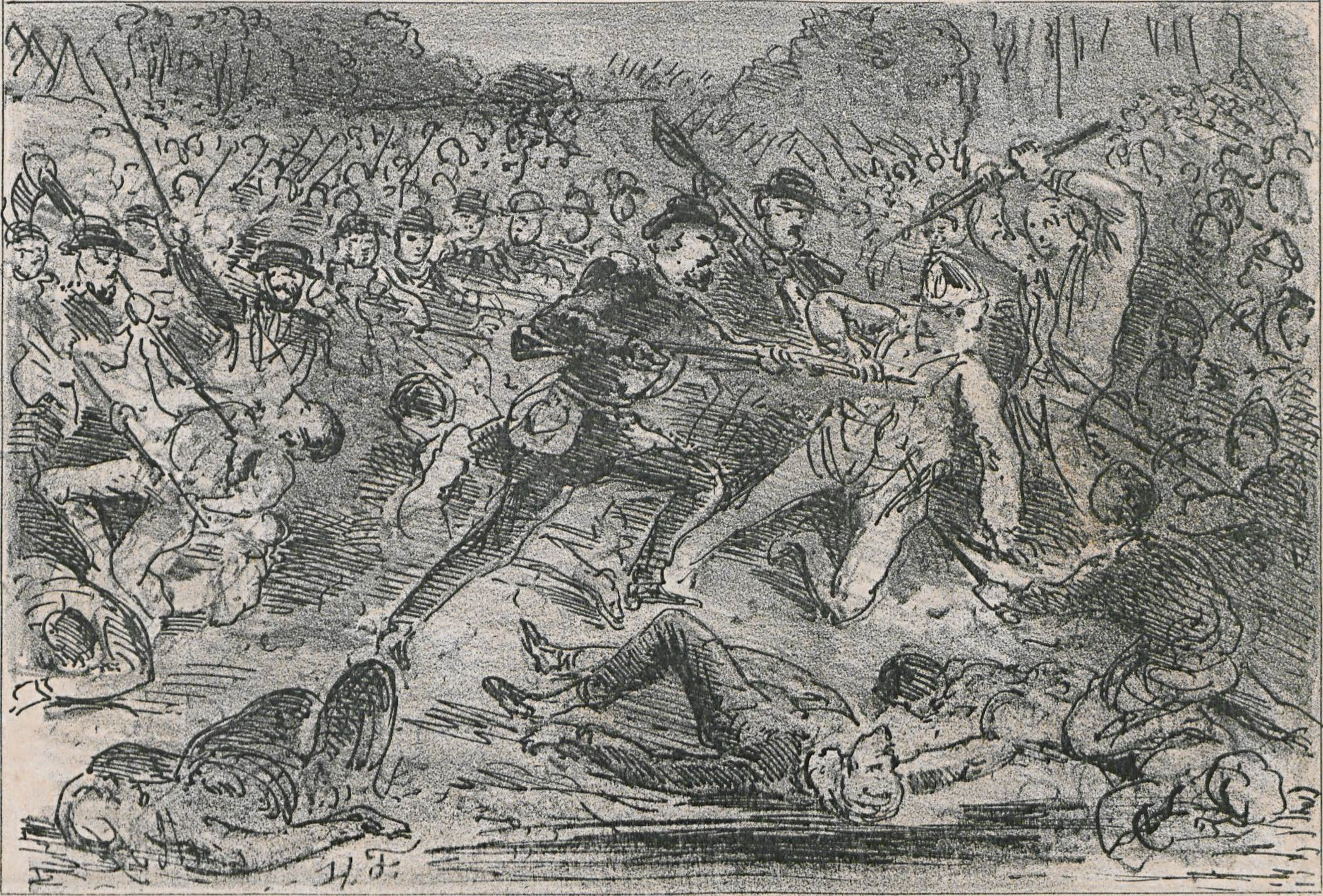
Episode of the combat on the Carvalho Island (Semana Illustrada, nº 283, 13/05/1866).
