= João Carlos de Villagran Cabrita =

Brazilian military engineer

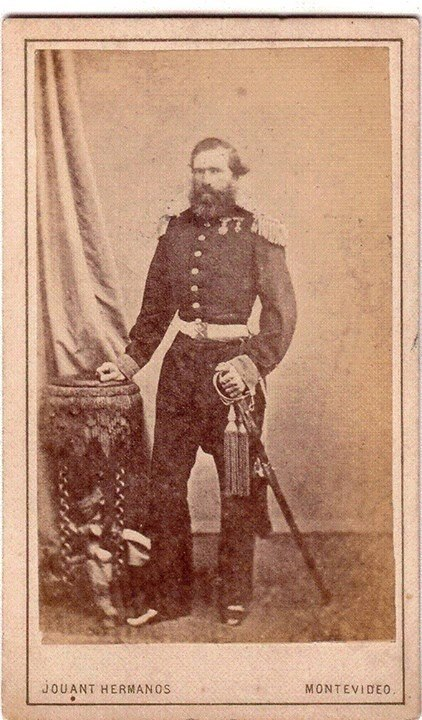
- Born: 30 December 1820; Montevideo, Cisplatina, Kingdom of Brazil
- Died: 10 April 1866 (aged 45); Itapiru Fortress, Ñeembucú Department, Paraguay
- Military career
- Allegiance: Empire of Brazil
- Branch: Imperial Brazilian Army
- Service years: 1840 — 1866
- Rank: Lieutenant Colonel
- Conflicts: Paraguayan War; Battle of Purutué Bank †

João Carlos de Villagran Cabrita (30 December 1820 – 10 April 1866) was a Brazilian military engineer who was known for his participation and sacrifice in the Battle of Purutué Bank in the Paraguayan War.

== Biography ==
He was born on 30 December 1820 in Montevideo, Cisplatina which had been conquered and annexed by the United Kingdom of Portugal, Brazil and the Algarves in 1816. He was recognized as a cadet in 1840, as his father, Major Francisco de Paula Avelar Cabrita, served in the Portuguese Army in Montevideo. Cabrita was promoted to lieutenant in 1842 and served in the 1st Foot Artillery Battalion, and then in Pernambuco, graduating with a bachelor's degree in Mathematics and Physical Sciences in 1847. He participated in the creation of the first engineering unit of the Imperial Brazilian Army, the 1st Engineering Battalion, leaving with the battalion for the Paraguayan War in June 1865. The following year he assumed command of the battalion.

Cabrita was considered a hero in the Itapiru Fortress, where he disembarked at dawn on 10 April 1866, with his battalion of 900 men on an island in front of the enemy, in what was the first battle to take place in Paraguayan territory. After the fights had been won, while he was writing the report on the Battle of Purutué Bank, aboard a small boat, he was hit, around 2 pm, by an artillery shrapnel that took his life. His name was given to the island (Ilha do Cabrita). It was reported that he was killed by a grenade fired by Artillery Lieutenant José María Bruguez, who had been his best student when he was a military advisor in Paraguay.

The combat engineering battalion, in which he excelled, was named Vilagran Cabrita (1938).

He is the patron of the Brazilian Army's engineering, which celebrates its birthday on April 10.
