= Tebicuary River =

Coordinates: 26°36′16″S 58°11′34″W

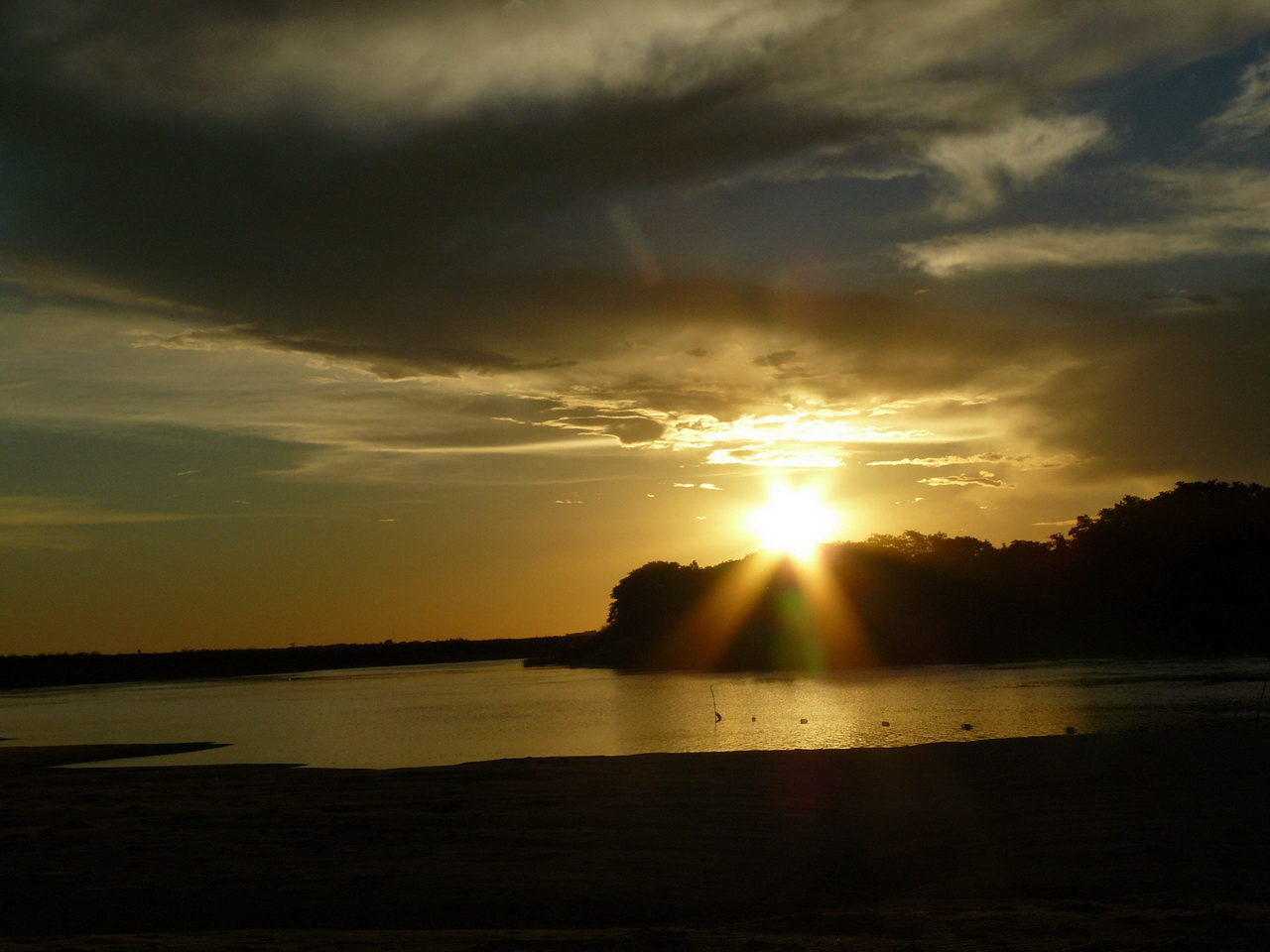

Location
- Country: Paraguay

Physical characteristics
- Mouth
  - location: Paraguay River

The Tebicuary River (Spanish: Río Tebicuary), a tributary of Paraguay River is a river in Paraguay. Located in the southwestern part of that country, it flows eastwards discharging to Paraguay River about 45 km south of Formosa and 30 km north of Pilar. Its mouth was the site of the Passage of Tebicuary in July 1868 during the Paraguayan War.

The San Rafael National Park in the river's upper basin.

== See also ==
- List of rivers of Paraguay
