= Battle of Yataytí Corá =

Part of the Paraguayan War

- Part of the Humaitá campaign
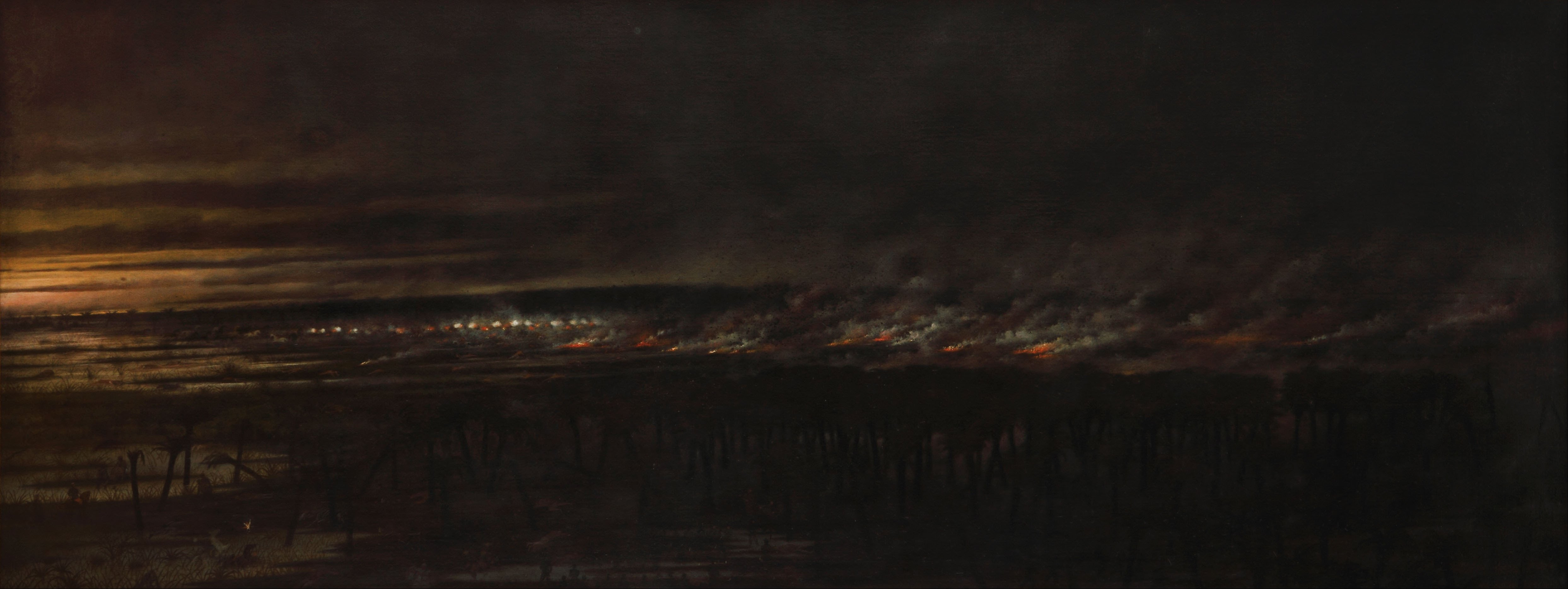
- Yataytí Corá, 2 July 1866, by Cándido López
Date	10–11 July 1866
Location	Yataytí Corá, Paraguay
Result	Argentine Victory

Belligerents
Argentina	Paraguay

Commanders and leaders
Bartolomé Mitre	Francisco Solano López

Strength
Unknown	2,500 soldiers

Casualties and losses
300 killed	400 killed

The Battle of Yataytí Corá took place during the Paraguayan War between Argentina and Paraguay in Yataytí Corá, Paraguayan territory. The Argentinian troops under the leadership of President and General Bartolomé Mitre won the conflict.
