= Fortress of Humaitá =

Former fortress guarding the River Paraguay, 1854–1868

Coordinates: 27°04′S 58°31′W

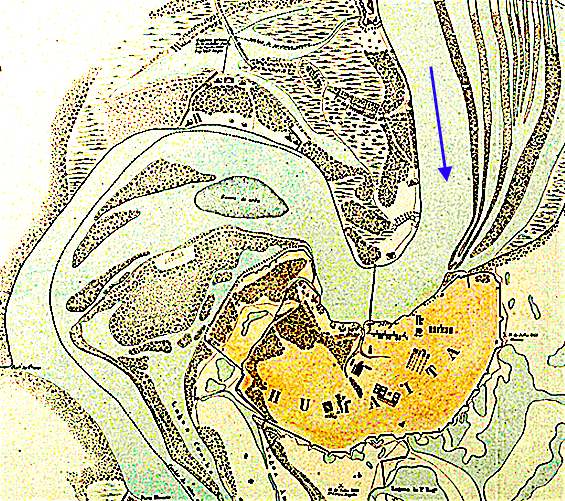
The river bend at the Humaitá fortress. An invading flotilla would have to steam for more than a mile against the current (shown by arrow) while being detained – by the chain boom – under short-range battery fire. But the greatest danger was from improvised contact mines.

The Fortress of Humaitá (1854–68), known metaphorically as the Gibraltar of South America, was a Paraguayan military installation near the mouth of the River Paraguay. A strategic site without equal in the region, "a fortress the likes of which had never been seen in South America", it was "the key to Paraguay and the upper rivers". It played a crucial role in the deadliest conflict in the continent's history – the Paraguayan War – of which it was the principal theatre of operations.

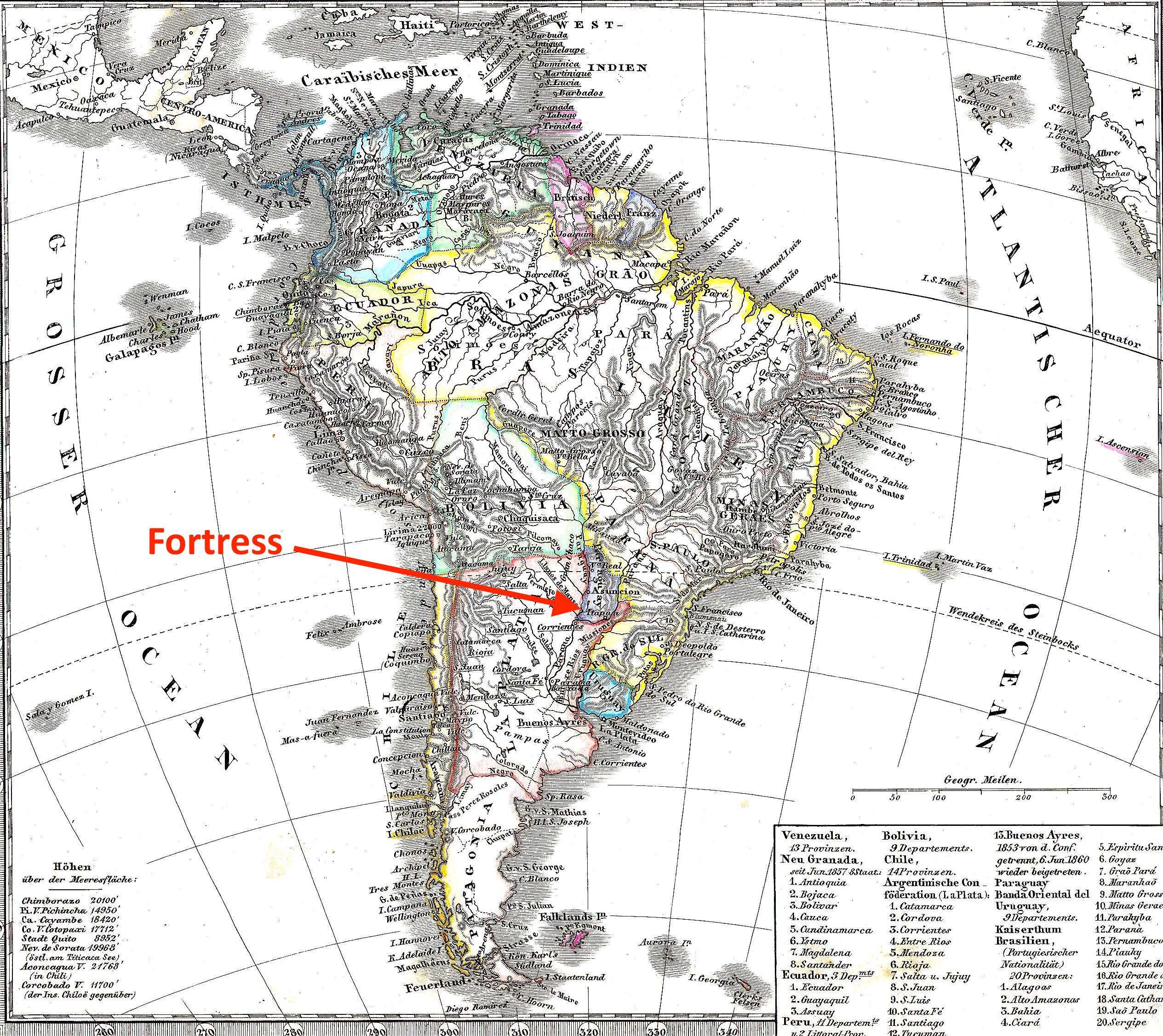
Location of Humaitá

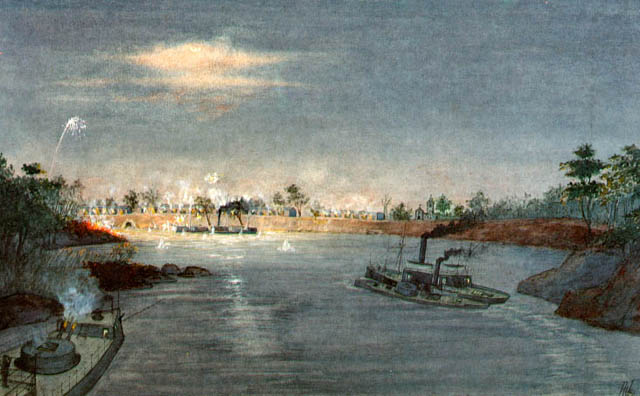
Brazilian ironclad warships at last dash past the Fortress of Humaitá, 19th February 1868. By the Brazilian naval engineer and watercolourist Trajano Augusto de Carvalho (1830–1898).

The site was a sharp horseshoe bend in the river; practically all vessels wishing to enter the Republic of Paraguay – and indeed to steam onwards to the Brazilian province of Mato Grosso – were forced to navigate it. The bend was commanded by a 6,000-foot (1.8 km) line of artillery batteries, at the end of which was a chain boom which, when raised, detained the shipping under the guns. The navigable channel was only 200 yards wide and ran in easy reach of the artillery. The fortress was protected from attack on its landward side by impenetrable swamp or, where this was lacking, defensive earthworks which, at their greatest extension, comprised a system of trenches stretching for 8 lineal miles (13 km), had a garrison of 18,000 men and deployed 120 cannon. At its zenith Humaitá was reputed to be impassable to enemy shipping.

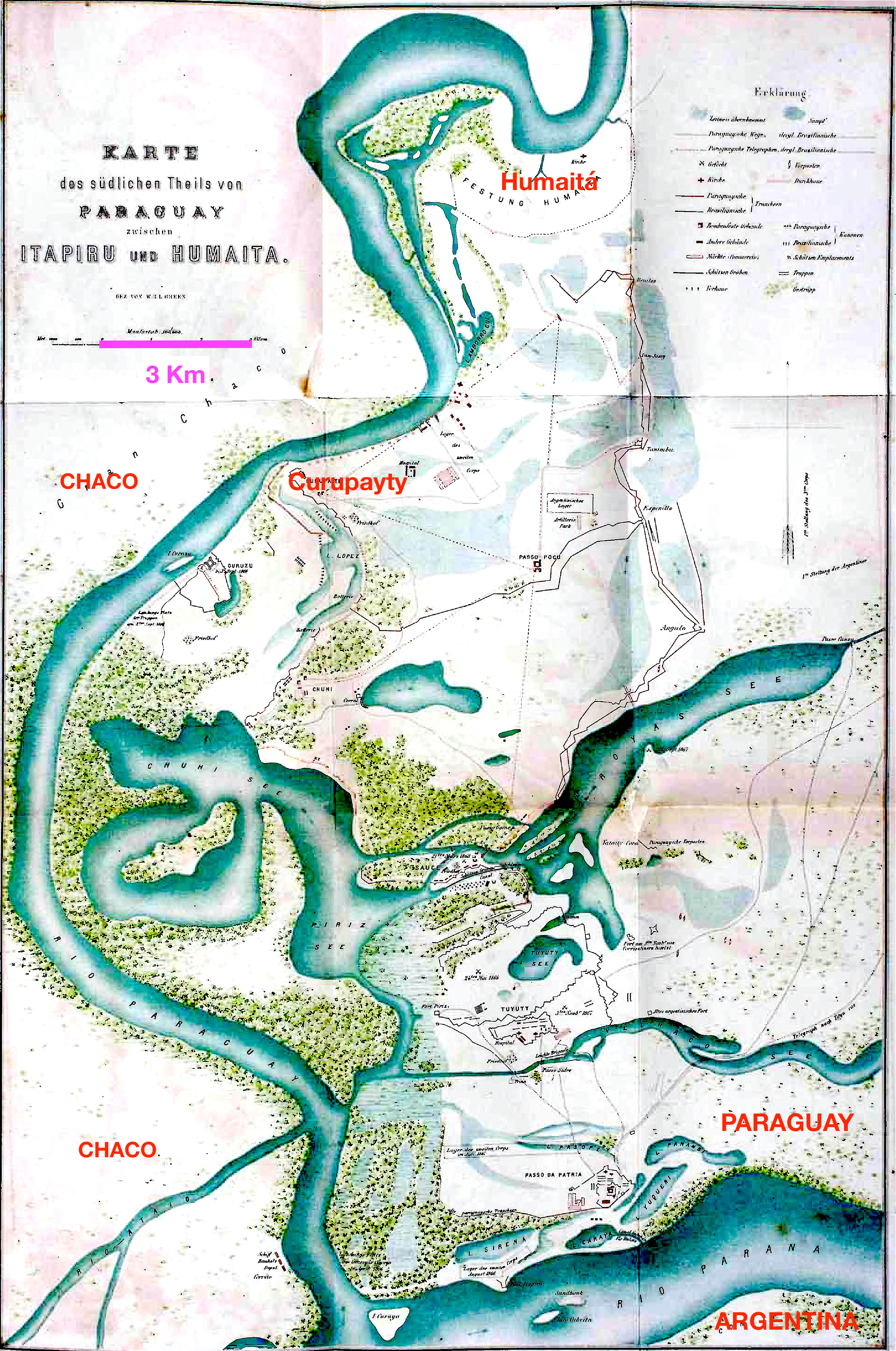
Humaitá in context. The small area where the Allies were bogged down for two and a half years in the wetlands of southwestern Paraguay. Notice the scale on the map.

The widespread perception which it created in its heyday – that Paraguay was a country difficult to invade – may have induced its Marshal-President Francisco Solano López to take unnecessary risks in foreign policy and, in particular, to seize government vessels and provinces of the much more populous Brazil and Argentina and to send armies to invade them and Uruguay. They united against him in the Treaty of the Triple Alliance. The war led to his country's utter defeat and ruin and the casualties were immense.

A declared purpose of the Treaty of the Triple Alliance was the demolition of the Humaitá fortifications and that none others of that sort should be built again. However the fortress, though not by then invulnerable to the latest armour-plated warships, was a serious obstacle to the Allies' plans to proceed upriver to the Paraguayan capital Asunción and to recapture the Brazilian territory of Mato Grosso: it delayed them for two and a half years. It was taken in the Siege of Humaitá (1868), then razed pursuant to the Treaty.

For present-day Paraguayans, Humaitá is a symbol of national pride, standing for their country's unyielding will to resist.

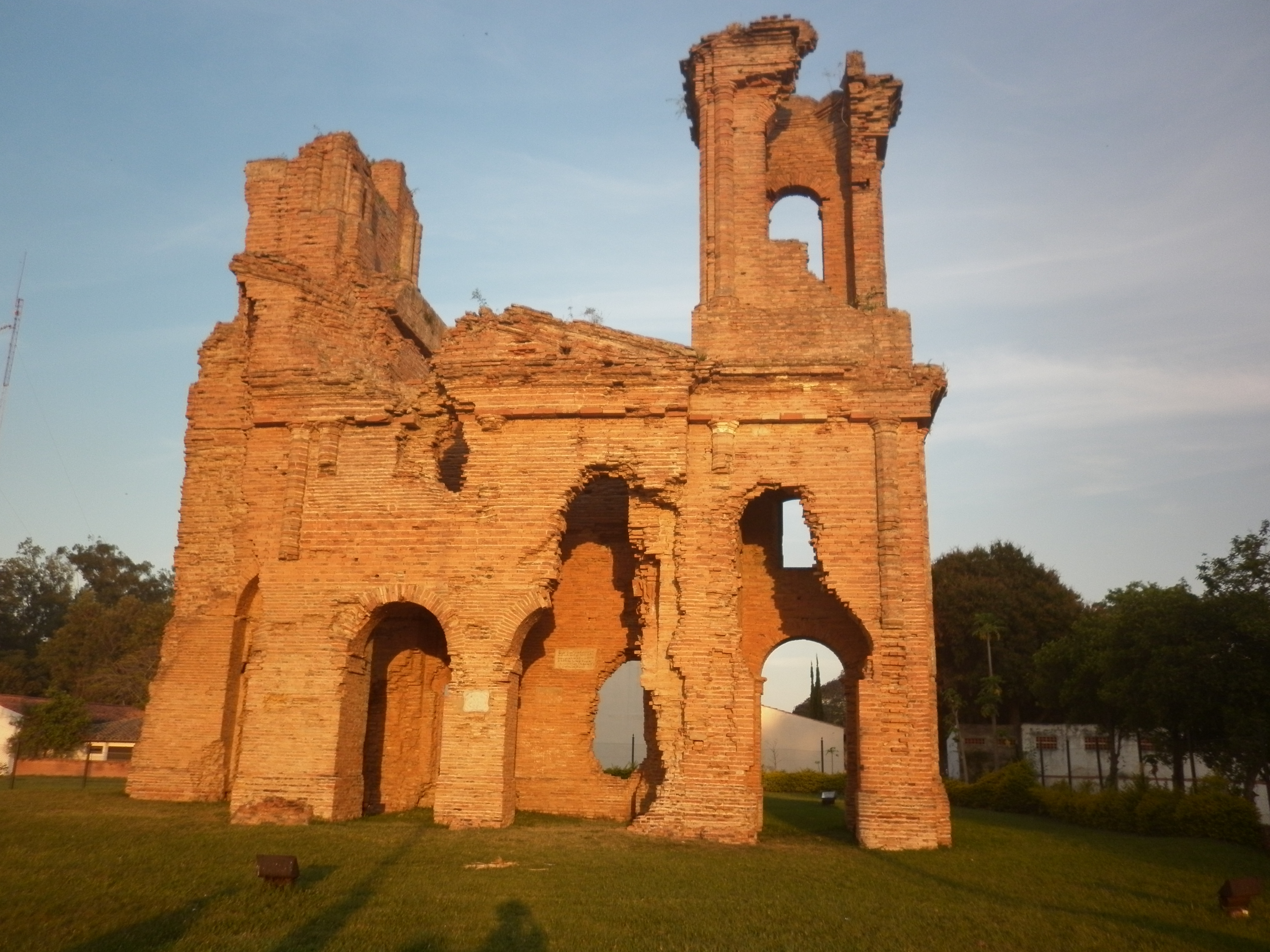
The ruins of the church of San Carlos Borromeo today. Part of the Fortress complex, the church was destroyed by naval gunfire during the War; being the only object in Humaitá visible to the Brazilian ironclads.

== Motives for its construction ==
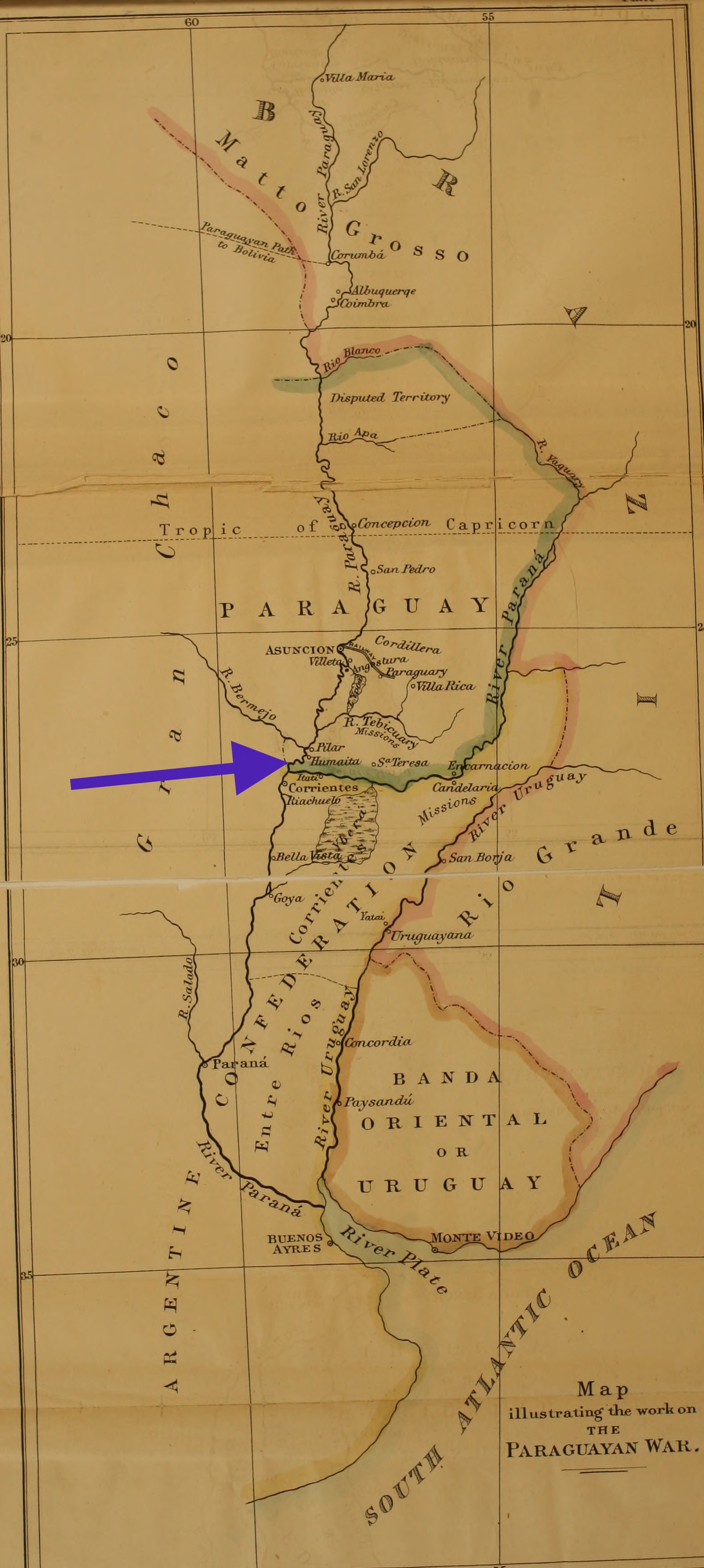
The key to Paraguay. The blue arrow shows the location of the fortress near the mouth of the River Paraguay. At the top of the map is the Mato Grosso, and the territory disputed between Brazil and Paraguay. (Source: Thompson, Plate VIII.)

=== Key to Paraguay ===
Paraguay is a landlocked country and for much of its history it was difficult of access, except by sailing from the Atlantic up the River Paraná and hence the River Paraguay (see map) as the early Spanish explorers had done. There were other means of ingress, but they would have required an invading force to be resupplied through difficult and hostile country. So the command of the river was key to the security of Paraguay, who feared and distrusted its two much larger neighbours Brazil and Argentina.

=== Anxiety about the Brazilian Empire ===
In a long history of conflicts between the empires of Portugal and Spain in America, the Portuguese made numerous incursions – some of them permanent – into Spanish-claimed territory. Slave raids by Bandeirantes (frontiersmen from what is now Brazil) into the Jesuit Reductions of Paraguay carried off many Guaraní inhabitants, who feared and despised the Brazilians. The boundaries between the two empires were not resolved and the conflicts continued after independence, when Portuguese America became the Empire of Brazil. Brazil had no practical access to its own territory of Mato Grosso except by sailing from the Atlantic Ocean up the River Paraguay (see map); fear that Paraguay might interfere with the navigation was a source of conflict. Where Paraguay ended, and where the Brazilian Mato Grosso began, was a matter of opinion.

=== Anxiety about Buenos Aires ===
The Spanish Viceroyalty of the River Plate occupied an enormous territory roughly coterminous with the modern-day territories of Bolivia, central and northern Argentina, Paraguay and Uruguay. Although it did not exist for very long (1776–1810) the Spanish Viceroy had his seat in the city of Buenos Aires. Upon becoming independent from Spain the city claimed and thought itself rightly to be the capital of an identical territory it called the United Provinces of South America. Other provinces – especially Bolivia, Uruguay and Paraguay – begged to differ and the Viceroyalty broke up in acrimony and warfare. In particular, Buenos Aires did not recognise the right of Paraguay to act independently and in 1811 sent an army under General Manuel Belgrano to prevent it, without success. The Buenos Aires governor Juan Manuel Rosas, "who viewed Paraguay as an errant province" during his dictatorship (1835–52) tried to bring Paraguay to heel by closing the River Paraná to commercial traffic (see Battle of Vuelta de Obligado). Buenos Aires province fell out with the other provinces of the Argentine Confederation and declared itself the independent State of Buenos Aires; it did not recognise Paraguay's independence even after the others had. It was not until quite late in the nineteenth century (1859) that a re-united Argentina formally recognised an independent Paraguay. Even so, the boundaries between Argentina and Paraguay were in dispute, notably the Chaco and Misiones territories.

=== Defensive outlook of Paraguay ===
Upon its independence in 1811 Paraguay tried to keep out of the anarchy of adjoining Hispanic America. Its dictator José Gaspar Rodríguez de Francia (1820–1840) imposed a strict policy of isolation. During his reign few were allowed to enter Paraguay, or to leave it. Professor Williams' assessment: "In an attempt to coerce Paraguay economically and bring it to its knees, Buenos Aires only stiffened Paraguayan nationalism and produced a voluntary, xenophobic isolation of the breakaway province".

After Francia's death he was succeeded by Carlos Antonio López, (called 'López I' by some authors, a convenient if inaccurate designation), the father of Francisco Solano López ('López II'). López I did open up Paraguay to foreign trade and technology, but the steamship made his country vulnerable to invasion and he understandably feared the machinations of his powerful neighbours.

During his presidency there were conflicts, not only with Brazil and Buenos Aires, but also the United States: the USS Water Witch affair of 1855 in which the fort of Itapirú fired upon an American warship, which led to a US naval expedition against Paraguay in 1858. Although Carlos López was astute enough to know when to back down, he resolved to make Paraguay immune to foreign attack in future.

=== Immediate cause of its construction ===
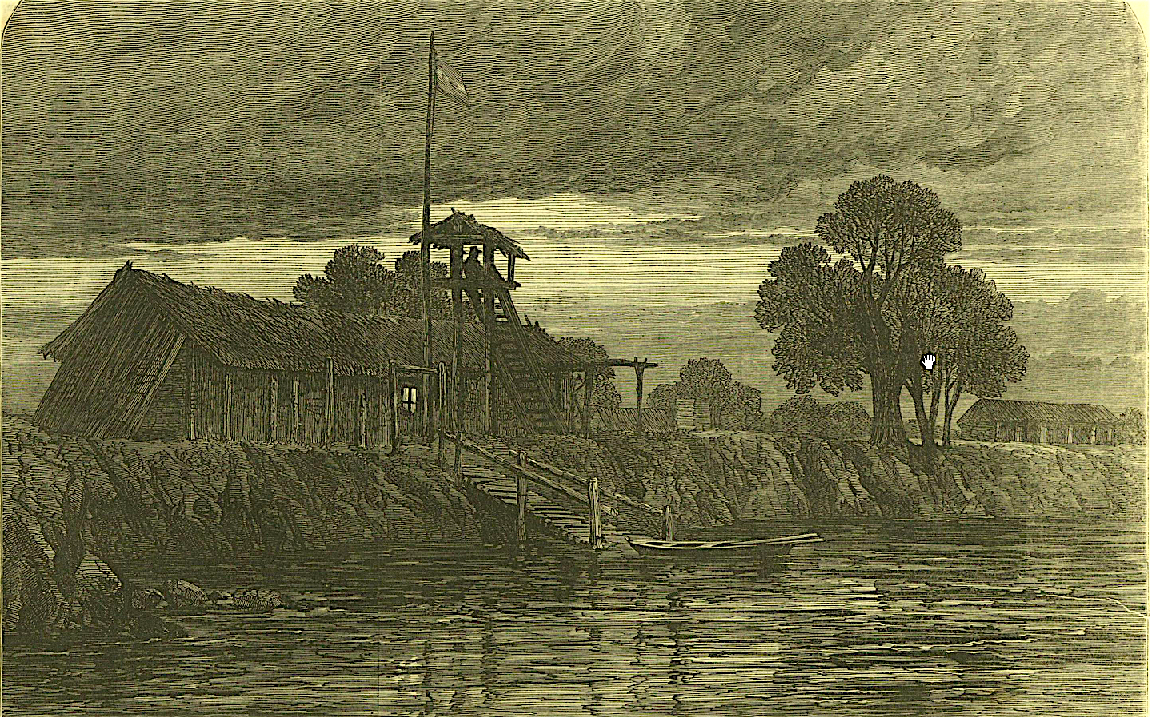
The Guard-House of Humaitá. Engraving in the Illustrated London News, 1864. The image appears to have been made earlier.

In 1777, in colonial times, a modest guardia (fortlet or lookout post) was established at Humaitá, a place about 15 miles above the mouth of the River Paraguay. However, a more formidable version was built in stages on the orders of López I. He started the work hurriedly in 1854 during conflict with Brazil over boundaries and navigation, when Paraguay was threatened by a Brazilian flotilla; fortunately for López, the Brazilians were delayed by the low state of the river. The Paraguayan author and diplomat Gregorio Benítes − who was in the Paraguayan army at the time − gives a different explanation. López I, hearing the Brazilian squadron was on its way, immediately transferred 6,000 troops from Paso de Patria to Humaitá; working night and day, in 15 days they fortified that place, including furnaces for making red hot cannonballs. The Brazilian squadron desisted because of the strength of the fortifications; the low state of the water is mentioned only incidentally. Thomas Jefferson Page USN wrote an independent account that tends to confirm Benites' version.

=== Initial works ===
To a design by the Hungarian colonel of engineers Wisner de Morgenstern, he hastily fortified the river's left bank with a few batteries, which were continually but slowly augmented, and a trench was dug on the land side enclosing the rear of them. He felled the virgin forest, leaving only a few scattered trees, grubbed up the roots, and laid out the first batteries, to whose completion some two years were devoted. By January 1859 the installation appeared formidable. As described by an eyewitness aboard USS Fulton, part of the Paraguay expedition sent by President Buchanan to demand reparations for wrongs alleged to have been done to the United States

Sixteen ominous apertures pointed their gloom, and whatever else they may contain, upon us; and, like the eyes of the figure in the picture, seemed to follow the vessel's motion ... These apertures are those of the casemate battery, constructed of brick, but very deep, and defended by the very formidable battery of sixteen eight inch guns.

Numerous other batteries were noticed. Fulton, having left the rest of her squadron behind, was allowed to proceed upriver.

The works, which were continually extended, were supervised by British engineers, of whom there were a considerable number on contract to the government of Paraguay.

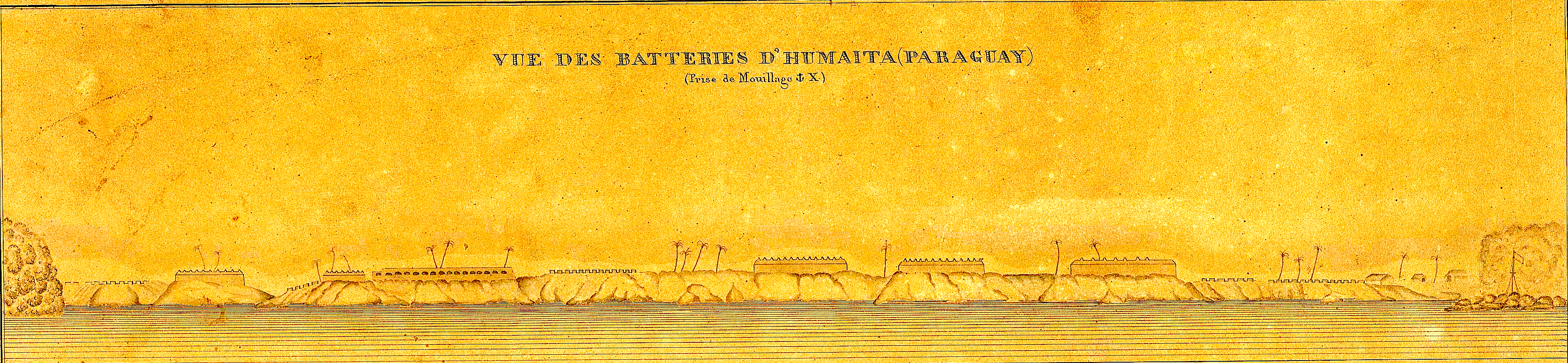
A view of the Fortress of Humaitá before the War (horizontally scroll). This elevation, probably sketched in 1857 by the future Admiral Ernest Mouchez aboard the French naval vessel Bisson, whom the Paraguayan government accused of spying, is one of the few depictions of the fortress as a working installation. (Most images that have survived were made after it was captured and partly demolished by the Allies.) Towards the left is the Londres battery with its characteristically wide gun embrasures. The sketch does not appear to show a chain boom. This copy of the French sketch was made by Brazilian naval intelligence at the Arsenal de Marinha do Rio de Janeiro in 1857 and survives in the National Library of Brazil.

== Description of the finished fortress ==
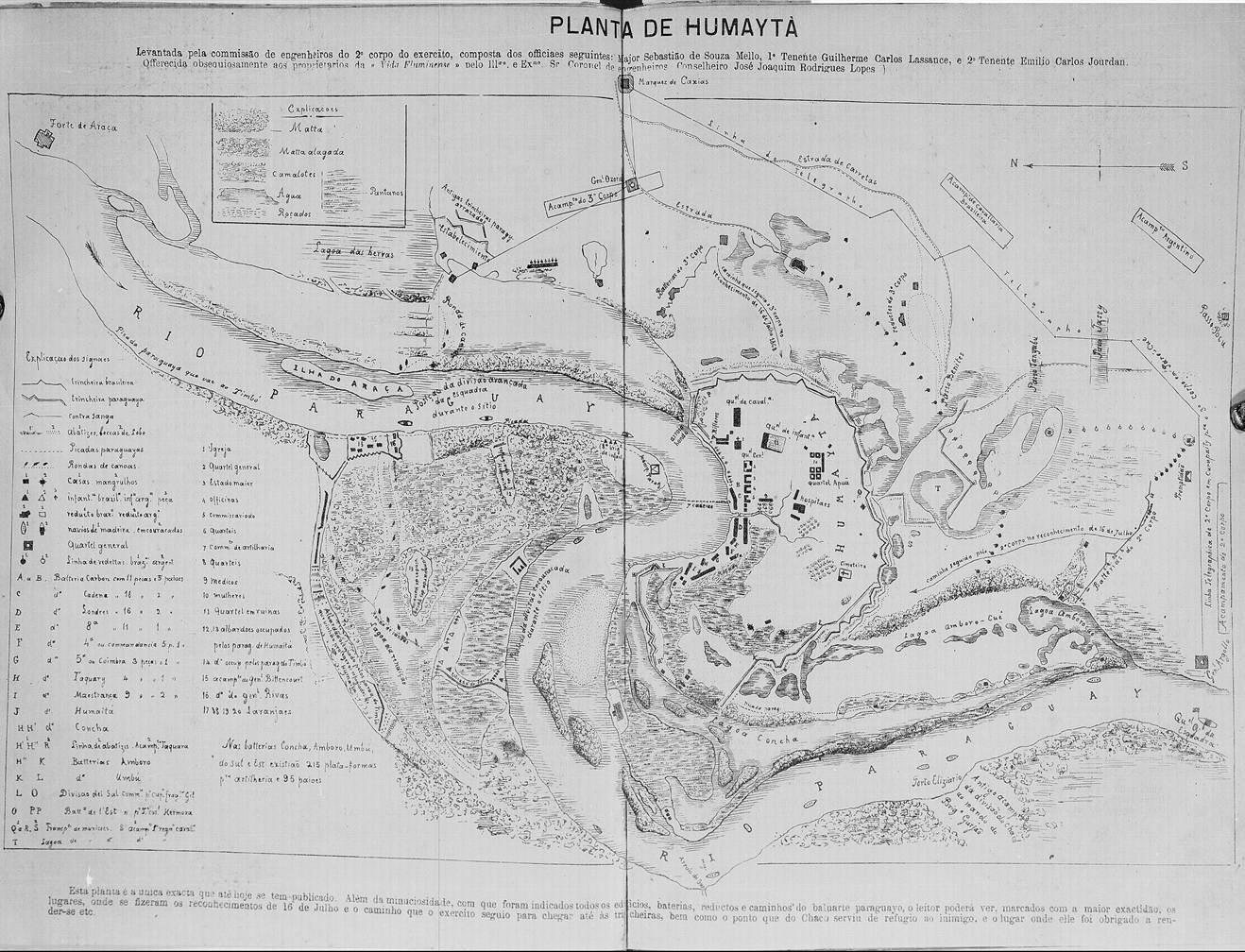
Detailed plan of the Fortress of Humaitá, showing the batteries and other installations. Evolved by Brazilian military surveyors late in the War, it also shows the Allied lines of circumvallation. (This image is best viewed at high resolution.)

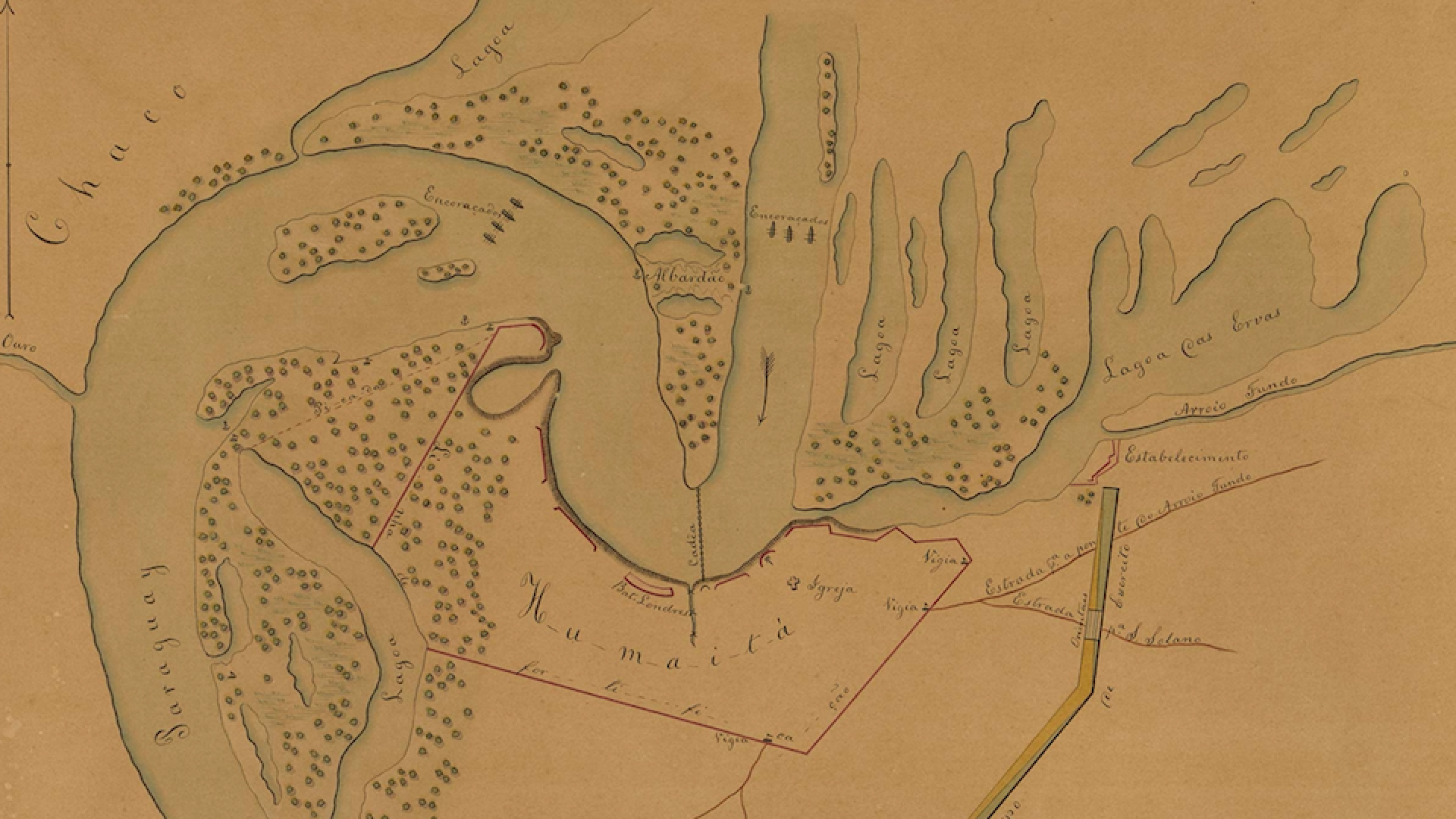
Another plan of the Fortress of Humaitá made by the Polish-Argentine officer Roberto Adolfo Chodasiewicz (1832–1891).

=== Location ===
The fortress of Humaitá was situated on a level cliff about 30 feet (10 metres) above the river, on a sharp horseshoe bend. The bend, called the Vuelta de Humaitá was an ideal strategic pinch point. It was some 1,500 metres (4,900 ft) long; the navigable channel narrowed to only 200 metres (660 ft) broad; the current was 2.8 knots (5.2 km/h; 3.2 mph) and in places 3 knots (5.6 km/h; 3.5 mph), difficult for the ships of the day to stem; and (a matter that was to horrify the Brazilian navy) ideal for the release of 'torpedoes' (nineteenth century floating naval mines).

An unpleasant surprise for an invading flotilla was that, owing to the peculiar conformation of the river bed, there were "treacherous backwaters which often neutralize the action of the rudder, in direct proportion to the length of vessels".

==== First impression ====
The explorer Captain Sir Richard Burton, who visited the scene during the war – when the Brazilians were still dismantling the fortifications – described it thus:

The sweep is more than usually concave, to the benefit of gunnery and the detriment of shipping. Nothing more dangerous than this great bend, where vessels were almost sure to get confused under fire, as happened at Port Hudson to the fleet commanded by Admiral D. G. Farragut. The level bank, twenty to thirty feet above the river, and dipping in places, is bounded by swamps up-stream and down-stream. Earthworks, consisting of trenches, curtains and redans, disposed at intervals where wanted, and suggesting the lines of Torres Vedras, rest both their extremities upon the river, whose shape here is that of the letter U, and extend in gibbous shape inland to the south. The outline measures nearly eight miles and a half, and encloses meadow land to the extent of 8,000,000 square yards – a glorious battlefield.

=== The channel ===
The 200-yard wide navigable channel ran close to the east bank i.e. the river batteries.

=== River batteries ===
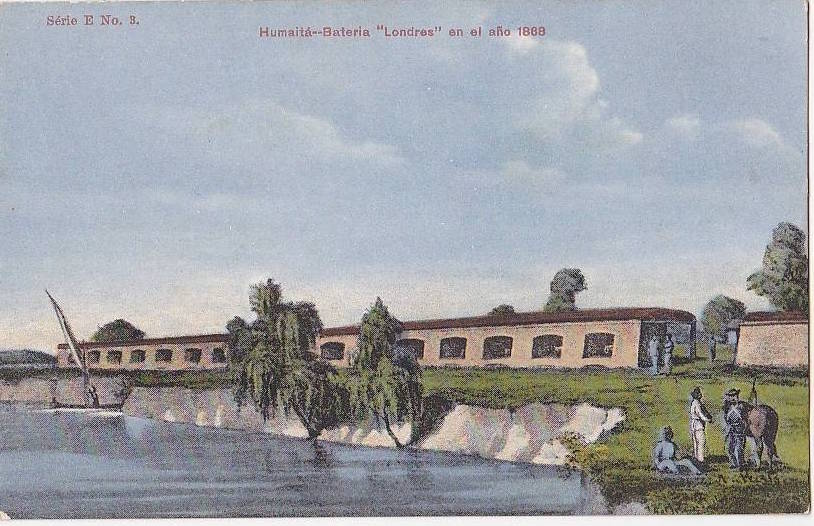
The Londres Battery of the Humaitá fortifications. Although this image by E.C. Jourdan of the Brazilian engineering corps has become iconic, it shows it in a state of part dismantlement. In reality the embrasures were protected by heaped earth.

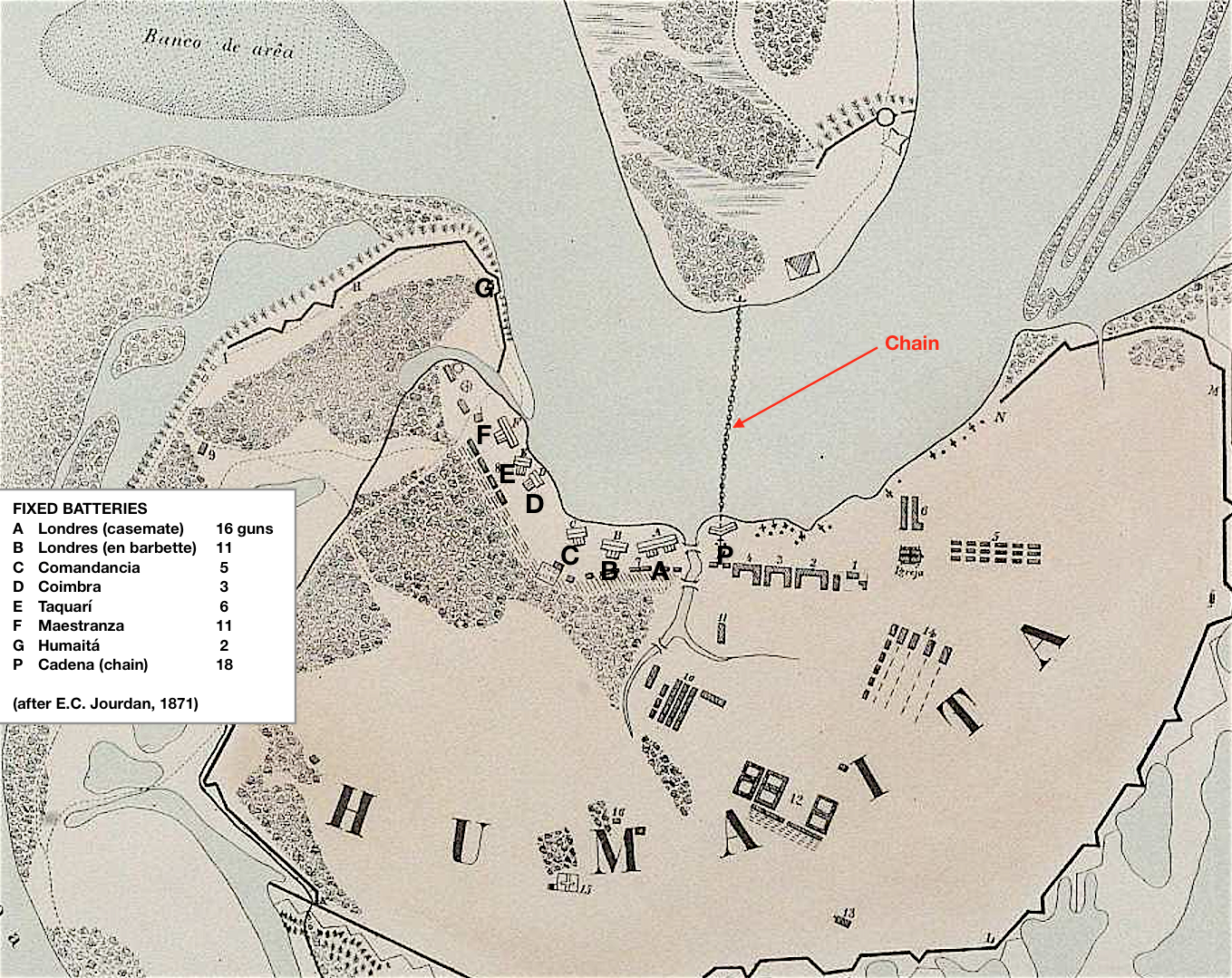
Batteries of the Fortress of Humaitá according to E.C. Jourdan (1871) of the Brazilian corps of engineers.

An invading force, if steaming around the bend upriver, would have to pass eight fixed batteries, all capable of concentrating fire on the reentrant angle. Furthermore shipping was within range of the heavy guns well before arriving at the bend, and well after it.

The batteries are variously named in the sources, and the number of guns may not have been constant.

==== Preliminary batteries ====
First the invading force had to pass the Humaitá redoubt, armed with a single 8 inch (20 cm calibre) gun.

It must then pass the Itapirú (seven guns); the Pesada [heavy] (five guns), all partly revetted with brick; the Octava or Madame Lynch (three guns en barbette); the Coimbra (eight guns); and the Tacuarí (three guns).

==== The Batería Londres ====
Next, the invading flotilla must pass the Batería Londres (so called because most of the técnicos in Paraguay were recruited by the Limehouse, London, firm of J. & A. Blyth). Its walls were 8.2 metres (27 ft) thick. It was supposed to be rendered bomb-proof by layers of earth heaped upon brick arches, and there were embrasures for 16 guns. "Of these ports" said Burton "eight were walled up and converted into workshops, because the artillerymen were in hourly dread of their caving in and crumbling down."

==== The Batería Cadenas ====
As a climax the invading force would come alongside the Bateria Cadenas (Chain battery, for it protected the chain boom), backed by the Artillery Barracks. According to a survey by the Brazilian engineering corps this battery had 18 guns.

=== The chain boom ===
The boom across the river, intended to detain shipping under the guns, is variously described in the sources. Richard Burton and Commander Kennedy RN said it comprised 7 chains twisted together, of which (wrote Burton) the largest had a 1.75 inch diameter link. It was made fast to a windlass supported by a house about 100 yards from the bank. Nearer the battery stood a still larger capstan. Other sources, notably George Thompson (de facto chief engineer of Paraguayan army) wrote that there were three chains side-by-side, of which the heaviest had 7.5 inch links, sustained by barges and canoes.

The official staff report of Allied force that captured Humaitá, dated 29 July 1868, by Cordeiro Torres e Alvim, said that on both banks of the river there were seven chains which, after entering the water, were bound to three. The latter were partly sustained by large floating iron boxes.

=== Approach ===
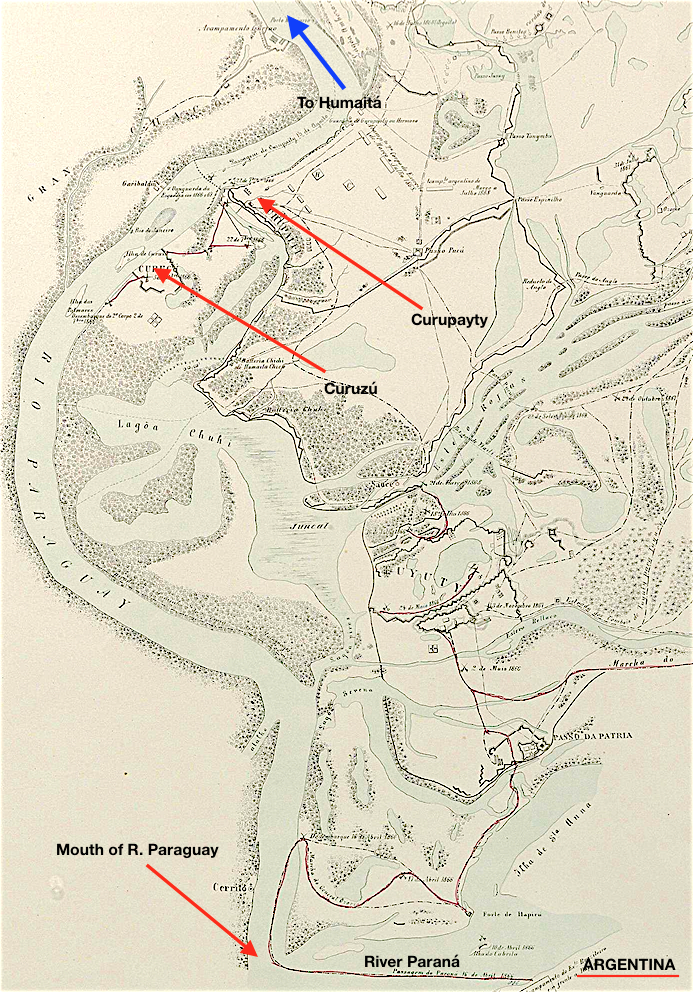
Approach to Humaitá. The River Paraguay from its mouth to the river batteries of Curuzú and Curupayti. Base map by Emilio Carlos Jourdan (1838-1900).

Before even arriving at the Vuelta de Humaitá an invading squadron would first have to navigate the River Paraguay from its mouth, and run the gauntlet of such batteries as the Paraguayans were able to deploy on its left bank, particularly at Curuzú and Curupayty. Whether unarmoured warships could have done so without being sunk was never ascertained; during the War the unarmoured wooden vessels of the Imperial Brazilian Navy did not attempt it.

Although heavily iron-plated ships ought not be sunk by these river batteries, their very weight and size made them difficult, and at times impossible, to navigate in the shallow waters of the River Paraguay. As Commander Kennedy of the Royal Navy observed:

The river Paraguay presents no important obstacles to navigation, the principal point to observe being the [seasonal] rise of the water; this varies sometimes as much as three fathoms [5 1/2 metres] ... The danger attendant on grounding in the Paraguay is ... [that it] has a sharp rocky bottom ... The entrance to the Paraguay at Tres Bocas is 500 yards wide, and at medium river there is a depth of twelve feet of water. The iron-clads of the Brazilian fleet, many of which drew twelve and thirteen feet of water, were entirely dependent on these periodical rises, both for forward movements, and also for retreat, if it should have been necessary. Their guns and ammunition were not shipped until they arrived at Corrientes; for the Paraná is equally shallow in various parts...

It is difficult to conceive a more formidable obstacle to an advancing squadron than this small portion of the river between Tres Bocas and Humaitá. The water is shallow, and most uncertain in its depth; the turnings in the channel are sharp and frequent, and every available point was bristling with guns of heavy calibre ...

=== 'Torpedoes' ===
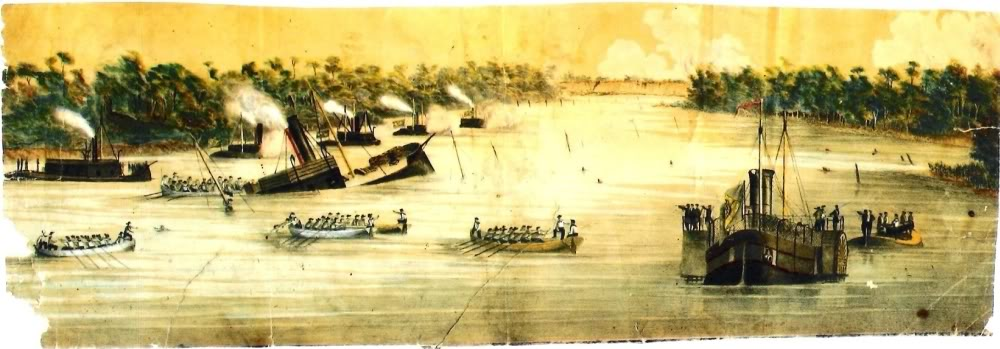
Brazilian ironclad Rio de Janeiro sunk by a 'torpedo' in front of Curuzú. Painting by Adolfo Methfessel (1836-1909).

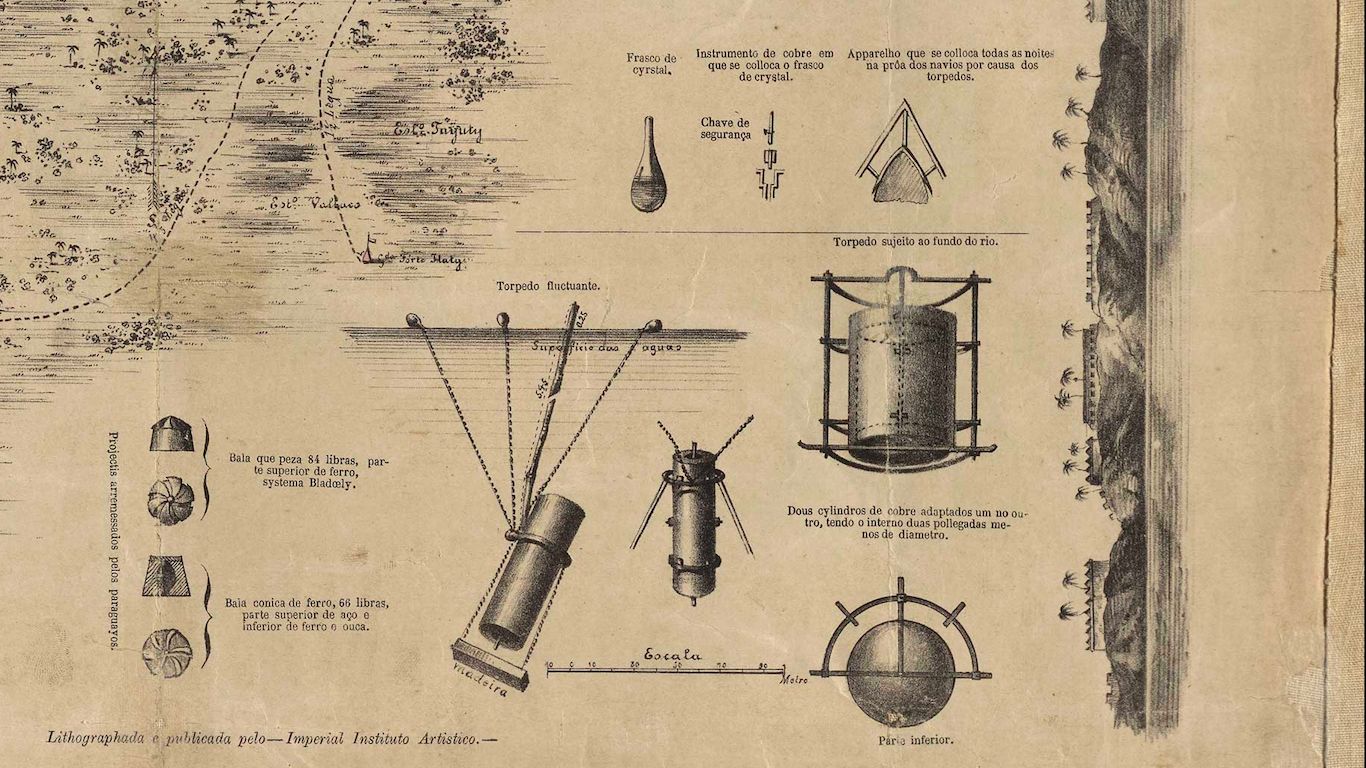
Paraguayan 'torpedoes' and other weaponry. From an 1867 illustration by the Brazilian military engineer Conrado Jacó de Niemeyer (1831-1905). Torpedoes of both the floating and underwater (moored) types are illustrated. On the left are Paraguayan armour-piercing ordnance, of which López had a limited supply.

For an invading force of ironclads the most dangerous aspect of Humaitá was not the artillery batteries but the 'torpedoes' that could be released in the confined, shallow and uncharted stream of the River Paraguay.

These torpedoes were improvised contact mines. The first was devised by "a Yankee, Mr. Krüger". They consisted of a zinc cylinder containing a charge of gunpowder. The largest ever made used a charge of 1,500 lbs (680 kilos) and the explosion shook the ground at the town of Corrientes, Argentina twenty miles off. The fuses were designed and made by George Frederick Masterman, chief apothecary to the Paraguayan Army: they were glass capsules of sulphuric acid which, when broken by striking a heavy object, ignited a potassium chlorate/sugar mixture.

Although most of these devices failed to go off, except prematurely, one did sink the 1,000 ton Brazilian ironclad Rio de Janeiro killing 155 men, so they had to be taken seriously. Since a "torpedo" (simulated or real) was released almost every night, the Brazilian navy had to have patrol boats out rowing in three shifts which tried to spot the floating torpedoes; if they did, they attempted to hook their floats with grappling irons on long lines. Wrote Commander Kennedy RN, "It was a service of great danger".

Apart from the more common floating type, which could be seen and removed, the Paraguayans deployed "torpedoes" moored to the river bed, which could not. These were a potent psychological barrier.

Deploying the torpedoes was not without its dangers either. After Kruger's death – he was blown up by one of his torpedoes – the work was taken over by a Paraguayan called Ramos who had served an apprenticeship in England. He met the same fate, and the work was given to a Polish refugee named Michkoffsky. Michkoffsky used to take the torpedoes down the river in a canoe paddled by four boys. One day he was distracted and the boys absconded to the Allies with the torpedo: he was arrested, reduced to the ranks and sent to the front, where he was soon killed. An anonymous, if brave, Paraguayan diver tried to attach a torpedo to the Brazilian ironclad Brasil by hand: this was deduced when he was found entangled in her rudder-chains, drowned.

The Paraguayans deliberately moored empty demijohns in the river to make the Brazilian navy suppose they marked the situations of torpedoes. It made them noticeably reluctant to navigate its waters.

=== Landward defences; the Quadrilateral ===
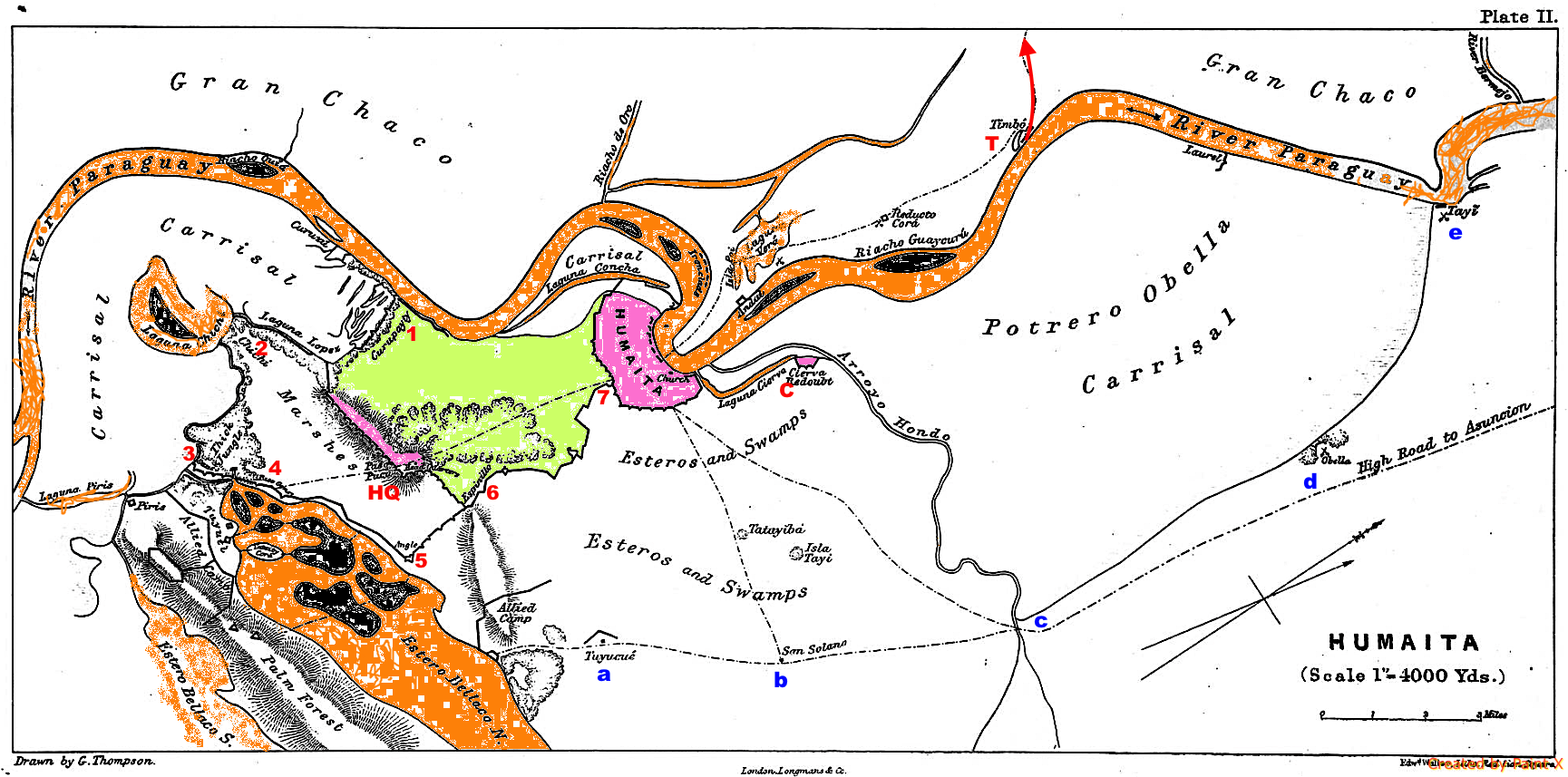
The environs and landward defences of Humaitá. Essentially, the natural terrain here was swampland, physically impassible to an invading army. There were only two narrow fronts where a military force might have squeezed through on firmish ground: 1. By landing at Curupaty. The country to the south of the Fortress (marked green) was meadowland, and an invading force might have landed at 1 Curupaty. The Paraguayans had foreseen this. To interdict it, they had built an 8-mile line of trenches defended by many artillery pieces and a large garrison. This was the Quadrilateral. In this map the Quadrilateral is denoted by the thick black lines. Other points on the Quadrilateral: 2 Chichi. 3 Sauce. 4 Paso Gómez. 5 Ángulo. 6 Espinillo. 7 Humaitá fortifications. Even so, the Paraguayans completed the trench at Curupayty only just in time. The Allies immediately launched a frontal attack, and suffered their worst defeat of the war. López'a headquarters were at HQ Paso Pucú; he had telegraph lines running to the other important points. 2. By bypassing the Fortress well to the east. The Allies were to discover, after much trial, error and bloodshed, that there was a strip of drying mud well to the east of the Fortress. Main places on this route: a Tuyucué. b San Solano. c Over the Arroyo Hondo stream. d Obella. e Tayí (where it was possible to rejoin the River Paraguay). To get to this route at all, it was necessary to start, not from the River Paraguay, but from the River Paraná in the extreme south. (Note: The legend "High Road to Asunción" does not mean that there was a road in the modern sense, only that the way was passable in principle.) Other notable features. At C López built the Cierva redoubt, which had no military purpose other than to confuse the enemy. (Thinking it must be important, they eventually captured it at enormous loss of life.) At T was Timbó, the nearest place on the Chaco side of the river where it was possible to land. Here López built a supply road that ran inland through 54 miles of deep mud; when his position became untenable he escaped through there with the bulk of his forces and artillery. Also at Timbó he established a fort that was to cause even more damage than the river batteries at Humaitá. The scale marked on the map is 3 miles (5 km). (Wikipedia annotation of a base map drawn in 1869 by George Thompson.

The Paraguayans had also taken precautions against Humaitá being seized from the landward side. Much of it was protected naturally by carrizal, marsh or swamp, and where not, an elaborate system of trenches was constructed, eventually extending over 13 km (8 mi) with palisades and chevaux-de-fríse at regular intervals, known as the Quadrilateral (Cuadrilátero, Polígono or Quadrilatero in various language sources). These trenches mounted batteries where appropriate. The trenches and natural barriers are shown in the map reproduced in this section of this Article, which was drawn to scale by Lt. Colonel George Thompson of the Paraguayan army; he personally made a detailed trigonometric survey of the ground. The map is corroborated by Burton's detailed verbal description based on his own inspection on horseback and on figures supplied to him by Lt. Colonel Chodasiewicz of the Argentine Army.

Burton reported that the layout required a garrison of at least 10,000 men; at the time of the Siege of Humaitá the Allied Commander-in-chief estimated that it had 18,000 and possibly 20,000 men and 120 cannon not including the river batteries.

==== Flood defences ====
The colonel in charge of the Paraguayan military engineering George Thompson arranged for part of the Quadrilateral to be protected by flood defences. The Quadrilateral had a weak spot or potential invasion point at Paso Gómez (the Spanish word "paso" denotes a pass), denoted 4 on the map in this Section. But by damming the Estero Bellaco N. at 3 where it entered the zone denoted "Thick Jungle" he raised the water level at Paso Gómez by more than 6 feet (2 metres). Further, he provided a sluice-gate. "Should the enemy get [in] and prepare for a rush ... the gate would be opened, and a terrible flood of water would carry them all before it into the 'carrizal'."

==== Electrical telegraphy ====
In the final stages of the fortifications electrical telegraph lines were laid out from Humaitá and the points in the Quadrilateral to López's headquarters at Pasó Pucú; and he could instantly be informed—in Morse code—of an enemy attack on any point. George Thompson recorded that the Guaraní became adept telegraphists. "The telegraphs were kept working all day, the commander of a division being obliged to report every little thing to López, who was receiving these despatches all day long".

==== Headquarters ====
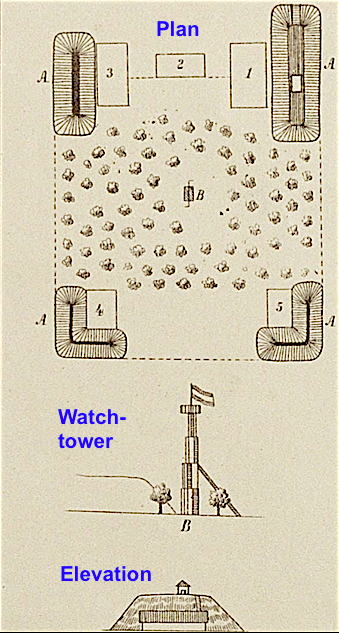
Earthworks protecting López's house; the watchtower. Key: A = The traverses or earthworks. B = Mangrullo or watchtower. 1 = The President's house. 2, 3 = his family. 4,5 = his servants. Sketch by E. C. Jourdan of the Brazilian corps of engineers.

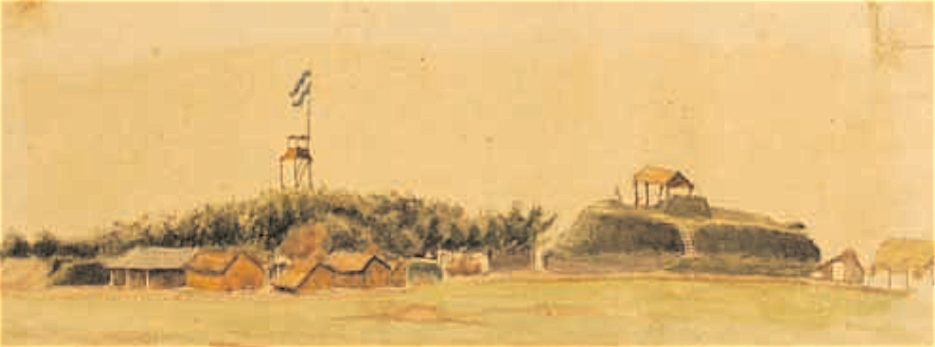
'Paso Pucú. Headquarters of the tyrant López. Earthwork to protect him from Allied fire − done from the life' . Painting (and title) by the Argentine general and watercolourist José Ignacio Garmendía (1841-1925). (An Argentine flag flies over the captured watchtower.)

López II established his headquarters at Paso Pucú, one of the corners of the Quadrilateral (see map in this Section). Amongst orange groves stood the dwellings of López, his mistress Eliza Lynch, and military officers who enjoyed his confidence e.g. Generals Barrios, Resquín, and Bruges; also Bishop Palacios, Lt Colonel George Thompson the chief engineer and Dr Stewart the surgeon-general. The houses were simple ranchos (austere dwellings) with thatched roofs. A quadrangle of large traverses or earthworks protected from Allied artillery fire his house, that of Mrs Lynch, and those of his servants. These earthworks were made of sods and the largest was said to contain 422,080 pieces. At the centre of the quadrangle was a mangrullo or watchtower. According to Burton the mangrullo's ladders were surrounded by hides and matting, "an unusual precaution intended to conceal petticoated ankles", for it was used by Mrs Lynch; and indeed a contemporaneous drawing by the Brazilian engineering corps does show, unusually for Paraguay, a mangrullo with a covered ascent.

A large military hospital was established halfway between Humaitá and Paso Pucú and another one for field officers at Paso Pucú itself. At Paso Pucú there were two settlements for female camp-followers; they assisted in the hospitals and washed the soldiers' clothes. They were allowed no rations, and lived on what beef the soldiers gave them. There was a cemetery, and a prisoner-of war compound.

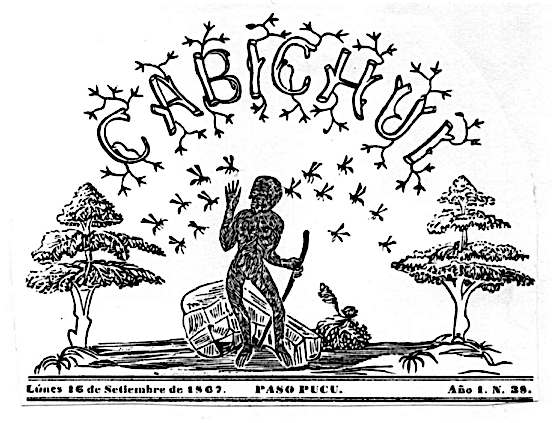
Masthead of the Paraguayan military newspaper El Cabichuí published at the Fortress complex. A cloud of cabichuís (local venomous wasps) assails an Afro-Brazilian.

==== Newspapers ====
At headquarters were published the military newspapers Cabichuí (Spanish) and Cacique Lambaré (mainly in Guaraní). These featured crude but effective propaganda woodcuts, often of a racially offensive nature. Paper was in short supply but an ersatz version was improvised from caraguatá (wild pineapple).

==== Unmapped terrain ====
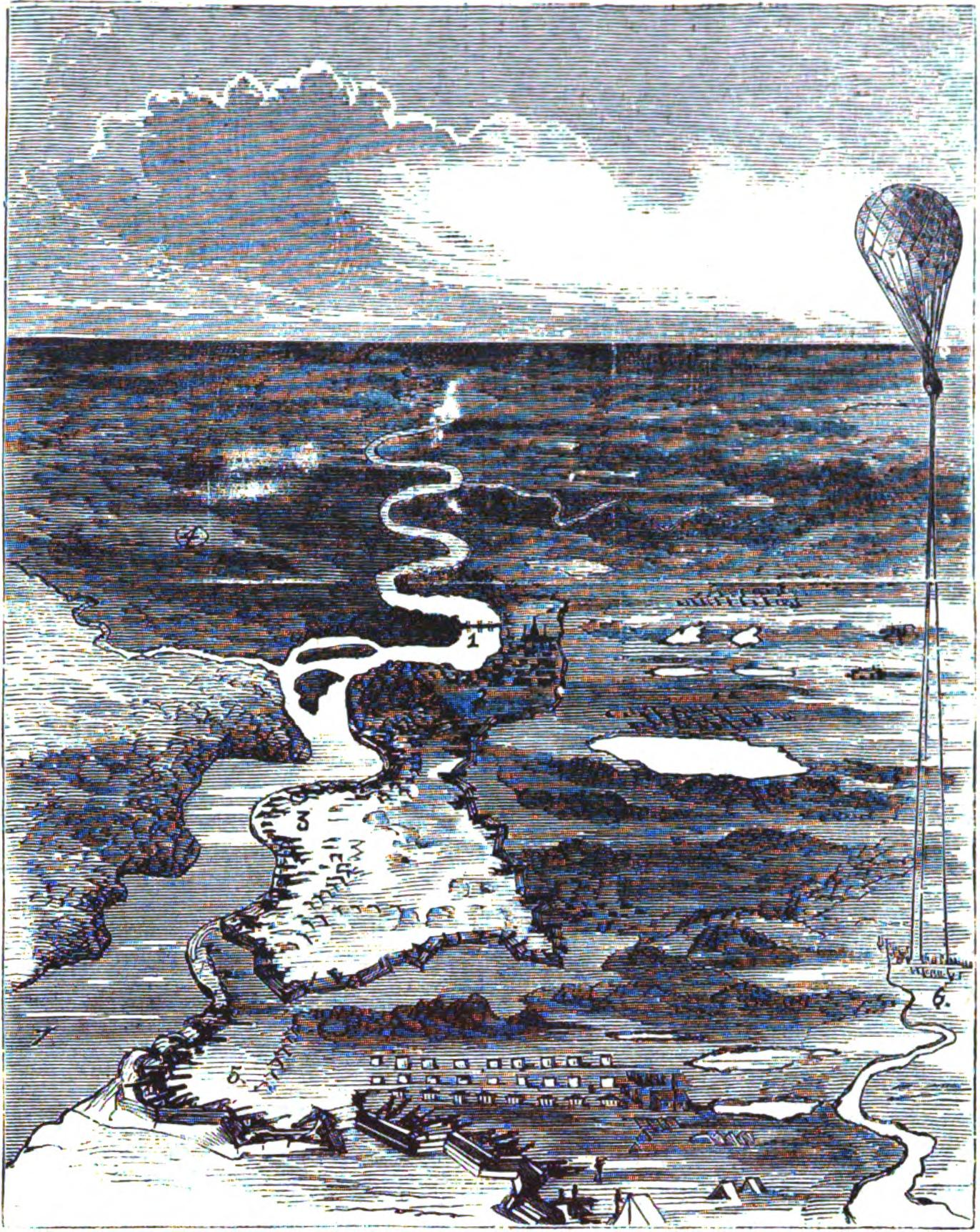
Bird's-eye view of the Fortress of Humaitá from an observation balloon. (Harper's Weekly: A Journal of Civilization, 1868.). The chain boom is marked at 1; the outwork of Curupaity at 5.

While the Paraguayans were familiar with the ground, maps of the territory were, for the Allies, non-existent. The area lay in the province of Ñeembucú, which is flat, low-lying and obscured by swamp or carrizal. For example, when they established their main camp at Tuyutí in southern Paraguay the Allies did not realise they were placing it within earshot of the southwestern line of the Quadrilateral: the Sauce trench. They did not even know Humaitá was protected by the Quadrilateral: In his 5-volume work on the Paraguayan war the Brazilian historian Tasso Fragoso insists that a Brazilian high command letter of April 1867

does not leave the slightest doubt that the allies were completely ignorant not only of the topography of the terrain [to the south-east of the fortress], but that all of it was protected by lines of [Paraguayan] entrenchments.

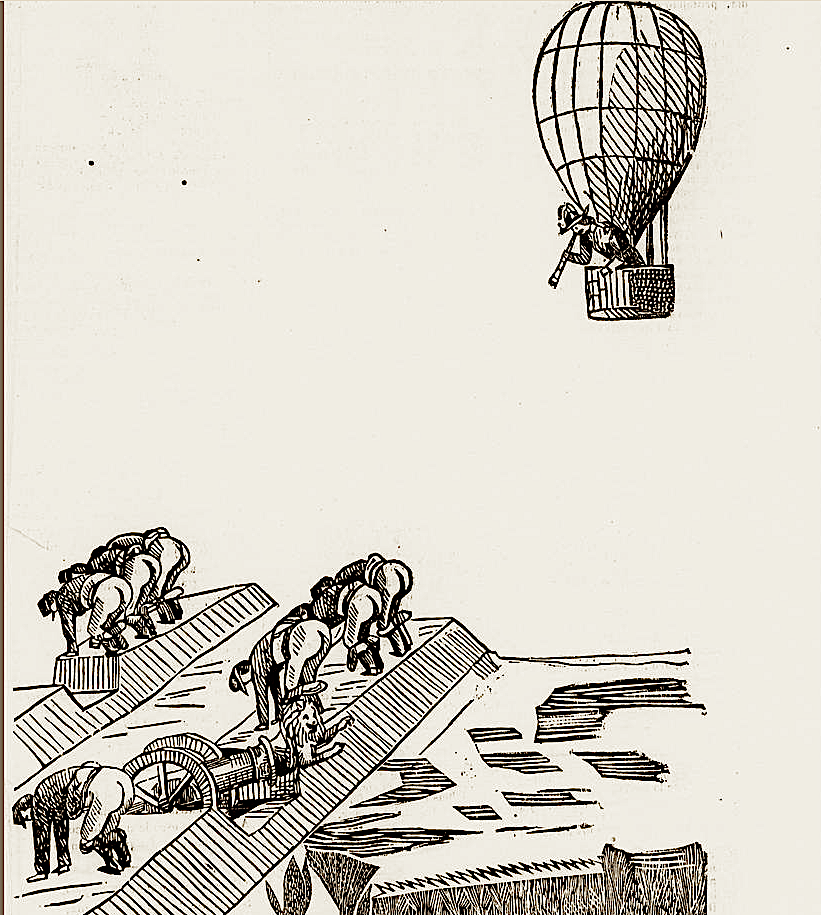
Paraguayan soldiers mooning at the Brazilian observation balloon. Propaganda cartoon in the Paraguayan government newspaper El Centinela, 8 August 1867.

In order to gradually map the area the Allies were obliged to resort to mangrullos (improvised watch towers) or (a first in South American warfare) captive observation balloons, but the Paraguayans obscured the terrain by lighting fires of damp grass.

=== The Chaco side ===
On the opposite bank of the River Paraguay begins the area known as the Gran Chaco, with a different, hot, semi-arid climate. This part of the Chaco, now part of Argentina, but in dispute in those days, was inhabited by none except the fierce Toba nomads. The Chaco bank of the River Paraguay is low, and liable to flooding. In front of Humaitá the land was quite impracticable as far as Timbó which, when the river was high, was completely under water. (Later, military roads were made through there at vast effort.)

Later in the war, when the Allies started a flanking movement to the southeast of Humaitá, López sent and had the Chaco explored, and gave orders to build a road through the Chaco from Timbó (the nearest place on the coast opposite Humaitá where a landing could be effected).

The road through the Chaco was tolerably straight, and was fifty-four miles long. It did not follow the course of the River Paraguay, but went inland. The great part of the road went through deep mud, and five deep streams had to be crossed, apart from the River Bermejo.

Once he appreciated his position was hopeless, López used this road to escape from Humaitá with the bulk of his troops and artillery. They were ferried from Humaitá to Timbó by two Paraguayan paddle steamers, and on canoes.

== Strategic significance and perception ==
At least before the introduction of iron-plated warships, Humaitá had the reputation of being impregnable, and it became famous as the "Sebastopol of South America". During the war the European press compared it to the Richmond and Vicksburg of the American Civil War. It was also famed in Europe and the United States as the Gibraltar of South America.

Michael Mulhall, editor of the Buenos Ayres Standard, passed the site in 1863 and reported it to the world in these terms:

A succession of formidable batteries which frowned on us as we passed under their range... [A]ny vessel, unless iron-plated, attempting to force a passage must be sunk by the raking and concentrated fire of this fortification, which is the key to Paraguay and the upper rivers.

When López I built Humaitá all warships were made of wood, and steamships were mostly paddle-driven. Wooden paddle-steamers, if intending to proceed into Paraguay, would have had to steam, against the current, past the succession of batteries – where the range was 200 metres (660 ft) or less – and somehow cut through the boom of twisted chains, without being sunk: this appeared to be impossible.

While it might have been possible for an army to invade Paraguay without going past Humaitá, any such attempt would have been problematic. The only practicable alternative route − used by General Belgrano when he unsuccessfully invaded Paraguay in 1811 − led through the Upper Paraná and hence north through difficult country towards Villa Rica. This alternative route was considered by the Allies in 1865, but rejected as too difficult.

A modern appreciation by Professor Whigham:

As a strategic site, Humaitá was without equal in the region, for enemy ships could not ascend the Paraguay [river] without passing under its guns. It was also exceptionally well protected on the south and east by marshes and lagoons. The few dry areas leading to it could be reinforced with troops in such a way as to frustrate any attack.

Whigham said it was "a fortress the likes of which had never been seen in South America".

For Professor Francisco Doratioto, Humaitá (and environs) was the principal theatre of operations of the Paraguayan war.

== Weaknesses ==
"After a stare of blank amazement, my first question was— where is Humaitá? Where are the "regular polygons of the Humaitá citadel?" Where is "the great stronghold which was looked upon as the keystone of Paraguay?" I had seen it compared with Silistria and Kars, where even Turks fought; with Sebastopol in her strength ...; with the Quadrilateral which awed Italy; with Luxembourg, dear to France; with Richmond, that so long held the Northerners at bay; and with the armour-plated batteries of Vicksburg and the shielded defences of Gibraltar. Can these poor barbettes, this entrenched camp sans citadel— which the Brazilian papers had reported to have been blown up —be the same that resisted 40,000 men, not to speak of ironclads and gunboats, and that endured a siege of two years and a half? I came to the conclusion that Humaitá was a monstrous "hum" and that, with the rest of the public, I had been led into believing the weakest point of the Paraguayan campaign to be the strongest." Burton, Letters From the Battle-Fields of Paraguay.

In fact, Humaitá was not invulnerable, at any rate after a sufficient supply of river-navigating ironclad warships became available in South America. Indeed Burton, having inspected the captured site, thought that its potency had been greatly exaggerated – to the point that it was a bluff. The commander of the Portuguese war vessel Zarco, also there at the time, wondered how Humaitá could have humbled a powerful navy for so long.

=== Defective weaponry ===
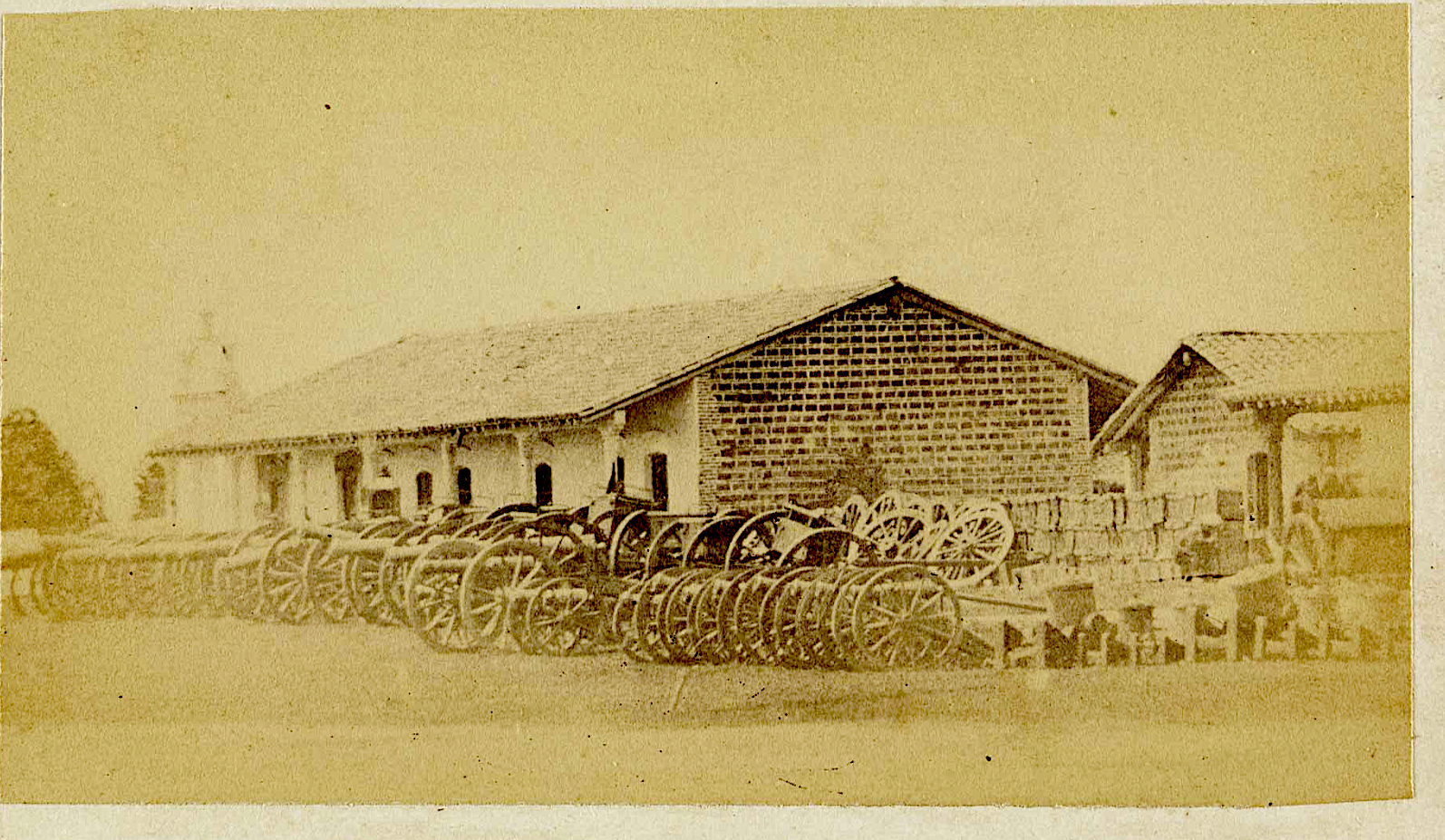
The last remaining Paraguayan artillery pieces at Humaitá collected for distribution between the Allies as war booty. "There were sundry old tubes bearing the arms of Spain; two hailed from Seville, the San Gabriel (A.D. 1671) and the San Juan de Dios (1684)".

Although Paraguay could and did manufacture large artillery guns, there was nevertheless a shortage—partly because guns had to be taken to reinforce the landward artillery – and not all of the guns at Humaitá were of acceptable standard. When Burton inspected them (August 1868) he noted that many had been thrown into deep water but the remainder were poor:

The guns barely deserve the name; some of them were so honeycombed that they must have been used as street posts... Not the worst of them were made at Asunción or Ibicuy, whose furnaces and air chimneys could melt four tons per diem. Some had been converted, but it was a mere patchwork. A few rifled 12-pounders had been cast at Asunción. There were sundry old tubes bearing the arms of Spain; two hailed from Seville, the San Gabriel (A.D. 1671) and the San Juan de Dios (1684).

However, Burton may well have been underestimating the Paraguayan artillery at its zenith: according to both Thompson and Jourdan, some guns had already been evacuated to the Chaco side by the Paraguayans when abandoning the fortress. The gunboat HMS Dotterel, while anchored at Humaitá for three hours in June 1865, from the river counted 116 guns, a number far greater than was recorded by Burton or Jourdan when inspecting the captured fortress.

=== Defective fortifications ===
According to Burton the system of fortification lacked the latest developments, mostly using the obsolete en barbette system which failed to protect the defending artillerymen. The consequence:

Thus the works were utterly unfit to resist the developed powers of rifled artillery, the concentrated discharge from shipping, and even the accurate and searching fire of the Spencer carbine. The Londres work, besides being in a state of decay, was an exposed mass of masonry which ought to have shared the fate of forts from Sumpter to Pulaski, and when granite fails bricks cannot hope to succeed. Had the guns been mounted in Monitor towers, or even protected by sand-bags, the ironclads would have suffered much more than they did in running past them.

Other observers formed similar impressions. Thompson wrote that it should have been easy for the Brazilian flotilla firing grape and canister to "sweep the Paraguayans away from their guns"". The British gunboat HMS Doterel, which had passed the site in 1865 (long before it was damaged in the war) likewise thought the artillerymen were far too exposed, Wrote a British diplomat aboard Doterel:

We counted 116 pieces of cannon, heavy and light, but all of these pieces, with the exception of one heavy battery of 16 guns [the Londres], are en barbette, and the crews of the guns are utterly unprotected from shell, canister, or rifle bullets. As regards the heavy 16-gun casemated battery, the embrasures appear to be wrongly constructed, according to modern ideas on such subjects, the large aperture of the embrasure facing the enemy, and becoming an excellent target for riflemen, almost all of whose bullets must tell on the crew of the gun within.

=== Obsolescence ===
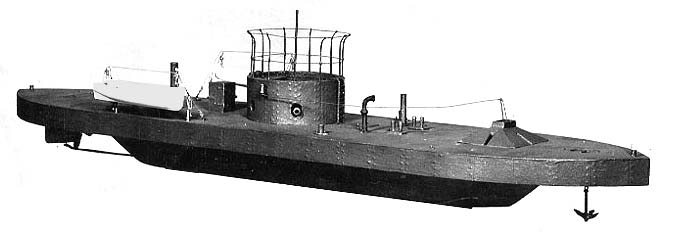
USS Monitor, the first monitor (1861).

López I fortified Humaitá in the era of the wooden paddle-steamer warship. Gloire, the first ironclad warship was not launched until 1859 and that was in France, intended for a blue-water navy; and no battles between European ironclads had actually happened.

However, the evolution of the navies in the American Civil War (1861–65) had fulfilled a demand for heavily armoured vessels that could navigate in river waters. The Battle of Hampton Roads, in which iron-armoured Union and Confederate warships were unable to sink each other, dramatically demonstrated their resistance to heavy artillery. News of this naval engagement arrived in the River Plate on 14 May 1862 and was reported in the Buenos Aires Standard in these terms:

The two steel vessels commenced a cannonade a mile apart, without doing any damage on either side. In less than an hour and a half they were alongside, and then raged so terrible an encounter that both vessels were enveloped in smoke. Two balls from the Monitor entered her adversary's cuirass; as soon as the wind cleared away the smoke the Monitor was seen running round Merrimac, looking for a vulnerable point, the vessels being about 35 yards apart ...

The Merrimac drove her spur against the Monitor, which received the awful shock motionless and unhurt. Now they were so close that the guns fired into each others' mouths: at length the Confederate got a wound which made her hail the others to tow her into Norfolk. After so terrible a conflict for several hours against heavy artillery, the Monitor showed only a few dinges and scratches. The Merrimac's spur scarcely marked her side.

The superiority so established of steel-clad vessels has caused an immense sensation in America ...

The American sea-fight caused great excitement in England, since it was feared that the new invention would rob that country of naval supremacy. Wooden men of war were declared, in the House of Commons, to be useless, and the Admiralty had stopped all the fortifications and arsenals, to devote all attention to the construction of a steel fleet 35 in number.

Apart from the more conventional ironclads, which the Brazilian navy could order from Britain or France, as noted the Americans had invented the monitor, an armoured, shallow draft, turreted vessel that presented little superstructure to enemy fire; monitors could be and were built in Brazil. Thus by the time López II fired the first shots against Brazil (December 1864) the Humaitá defences were obsolescent to the latest naval weaponry that could be manufactured or purchased. Brazil was an enormous country and after the war broke out it could have (and soon did have) at least 10 ironclads.

That said, an ironclad naval force, by itself, was unlikely to pose a strategic threat to the Paraguayan nation. For assuming the latest ironclads could get past Humaitá – which they eventually did – it did not follow that unarmoured troopships could do so. Without the logistical support of an invading army, ironclads could not have operated far ahead of their lines of supply, except temporarily.

=== Lack of tautness in the chain boom ===
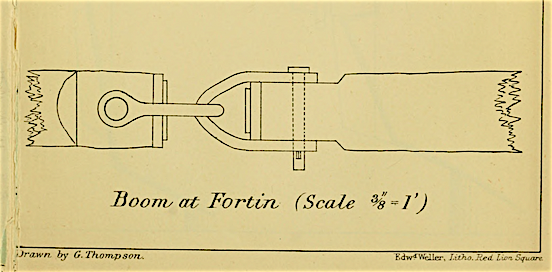
Chain boom. Thompson was critical of the design of the chain boom at Humaitá. At Fortín he designed this chain boom made of timbó logs joined endwise by iron shackles. Since it floated underwater it could not be sunk by naval gunfire.

Even heavily armoured vessels might have been impeded by the chain boom, but it turned out to have an Achilles' heel: it could not be drawn tight enough without intermediate floating supports – and these might be sunk by naval gunfire.

Burton's description of the chain boom was:

The chain, which consisted of seven twisted together, passed diagonally through a kind of brick tunnel. On this side [of the River Paraguay] it was made fast to a windlass supported by a house about 100 yards from the bank. Nearer the battery stood a still larger capstan: the latter, however, wanted force to haul tight the chain.

This was so provided an enemy destroyed the chain's intermediate floating supports; for as explained by Thompson, the chains were

supported on a number of canoes, and on three pontoons. The [Brazilian] ironclads fired for three months at these pontoons and canoes, sinking all of them, when, of course, the chain went to the bottom, as the river there is about 700 yards wide, and the chain could not be drawn tight without intermediate supports. The chain was thus buried some two feet under the mud of the river, offering no obstacle whatever to the navigation.

=== Supplying the garrison ===
Because the marshlands were not ideal for the raising of cattle or the cultivation of manioc or maize, and because the Quadrilateral required a large garrison, food for Humaitá needed to be brought in from elsewhere. However, it was a very difficult position to supply.

Cut off by swamps, there was no easy overland communication with the nearest food-producing regions. There was a coastal road, but it was poor, unfitted for oxcarts or cattle droves during the winter floods. During the War there was a shortage of steam vessels; small river craft were difficult to land in winter. "Paraguay never resolved these transportation difficulties during the siege of Humaitá, and the army suffered the consequences", observed Professor Cooney.

Even so, Humaitá withstood a siege of more than two years.

== Unintended consequences ==
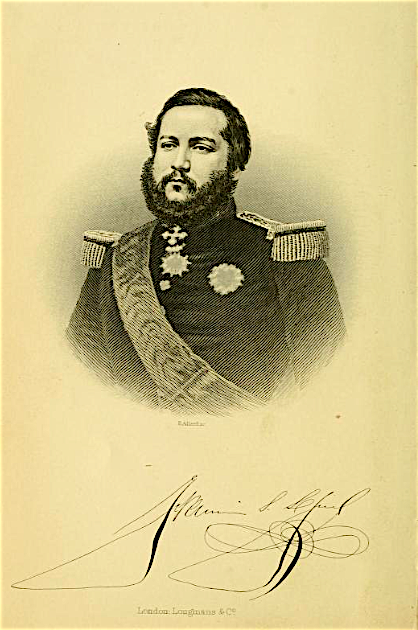
Francisco Solano López ("López II"), and his autograph.

The Humaitá system was built to increase the security of Paraguay, but its strength, real or perceived, may have had the opposite effect in the end.

=== Provocation of Brazil ===
For Brazil, the fortifications posed a potential threat to its own security and caused it to make some preparations for war. As noted by Lt Colonel George Thompson of the Paraguayan army:

These batteries commanded the whole bend of the river, and Paraguay made all vessels anchor and ask permission before they could pass up the river. As this was the only practicable road which Brazil had to her province of Matto-Grosso [sic], she naturally disapproved of her stoppage of the river, and gradually accumulated large military stores in Matto-Grosso, with the view, no doubt, of some day destroying Humaitá.

=== Inducing overconfidence ===
"Directly on my arrival into the camp I was shown into the presence of his Excellency... I expressed my surprise at... his government... detaining the Marques de Olinda. * * *He then went on with more candor than discretion to say that the situation of Paraguay was such that only by a war could the attention and respect of the world be secured to her. Isolated as she was, and scarcely known beyond the South American states, so would she remain till by her feats of arms she could compel other nations to treat her with more consideration. Paraguay was a small power, he admitted, in comparison with Brazil; but she had advantages of position that gave her an equality of strength with any of her neighbours. Every soldier that Brazil might send against Paraguay must be brought thousand of miles and at great expense; whereas the Paraguayan troops were on their own territory, and their services would cost comparatively nothing. Besides they would be already fortified and intrenched before the Brazilians could arrive in any considerable numbers, and then, having shown the world their strength, and demonstrated to Brazil that they were not to be conquered except at ruinous cost and sacrifice, the Imperial government would be glad to treat for peace on terms highly advantageous to Paraguay.... The war could not last but for a few months.... " Charles A. Washburn, Minister Resident of the United States at Asunción 1861–68.

For Leslie Bethell, López overestimated Paraguay's military power, which induced him to behave recklessly. According to Professor Bethell:

Solano López's decision to declare war first on Brazil and then on Argentina, and to invade both their territories, proved a serious miscalculation, and one that was to have tragic consequences for the Paraguayan people. At the very least Solano López made an enormous gamble – and lost.... Thus Solano López's reckless actions brought about the very thing that most threatened the security, even the existence, of his country: a union of his two powerful neighbours....

For John Hoyt Williams, Humaitá was instrumental in generating the risk-taking behaviour:

The hundreds of heavy calibre guns mounted at Humaitá and elsewhere, the modern navy, railroad, telegraph, and munitions manufacturing establishments – all helped to bring about the horrendous War of the Triple Alliance and their own destruction by providing the hardware with which Francisco Solano López could become the Mariscal and self-appointed arbiter of the Río de la Plata.

And:

Even El Mariscal would not have dared to do more than to defend his immediate borders had not his military materiel [Williams expressly specifies Humaitá] encouraged him to redefine those borders and play the wider and infinitely more dangerous role of fulcrum in the balance of power.

After the passage of Humaitá, the Buenos Ayres Standard wrote:

None who have ever seen the place have questioned its strength. Old President López had such implicit faith in its impregnability that he believed if even a Xerxes attacked Paraguay he could not get past Humaitá. The same implicit confidence in its strength was inculcated in the minds of the Paraguayan people. Their watchword was 'Humaitá', and possibly to the exaggerated idea of its strength by the present López may be traced the grave political error which step by step led this unfortunate man from the cautious policy of his father to become the great champion of River Plate equilibrium.

=== Alternative view ===
A possible alternative view is that López was aware that developments in naval warfare were making Humaitá obsolescent and so decided to take the offensive before Paraguay lost the balance of advantage altogether. Paraguay's chief engineer, the talented William Keld Whytehead, cannot have failed to become aware of the advantages of ironclad vessels and it is on record that in 1863 he obtained a British patent for an iron-cladded vessel; in October 1857 he had presented a project to López to construct ironclads (though it came to nothing). Indeed, López himself only eight months after the Battle of Hampton Roads was pressing the American ambassador in Asunción to procure a monitor for him; and Paraguay placed orders for several ironclads to be built in European or Brazilian yards before the War. According to Graz, Paraguay's agents Blyths of Limehouse prepared a design for a 200 ft double-turreted monitor, and even a monitor to be built in Asunción — armoured, not with iron, but with the extremely hard local timber quebracho colorado.

Further support for this view is afforded by López's hesitation in seizing the Marques de Olinda. According to Thompson:

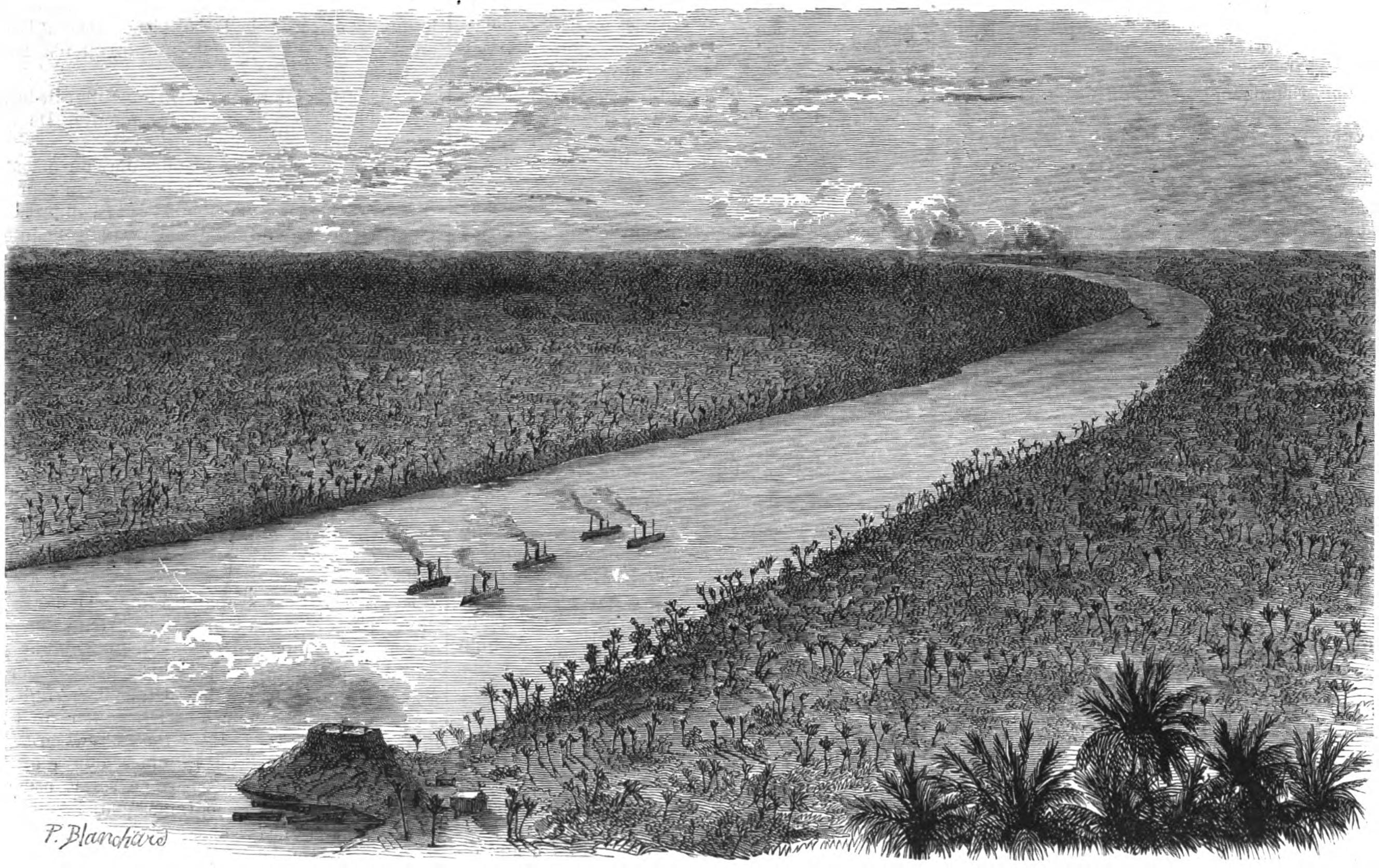
Passage of Humaitá by an armoured squadron of the Brazilian navy. Engraving by Blanchard of a sketch by José Paranhos, (1819–1880), Brazil's Foreign Minister. In a propaganda coup, Paranhos drew this sketch from his imagination and sent it to the French magazine L'Illustration, Journal Universel, predicting the war would be over in a month.

López was at Cerro Leon at the time [when the Marques de Olinda arrived at Asunción], and hesitated for a whole day whether he should break the peace or not.... [H]e knew he could assemble every man in the country immediately and raise a large army; he knew also that the Brazilians would be a long time recruiting to get a large force together, and he did not think they would wish to carry on a war for long. He said, 'If we don't have a war now with Brazil, we shall have one at a less convenient time for ourselves.' He therefore sent... the 'Tacuarí' (the fastest steamer on the River Plate)... to bring her back to Asunción.

As against that, none of the sources cited in the article establish why López declared war without waiting for his ironclads to be completed and delivered. According to Burton, "it was the general opinion" that with a single ironclad at their disposal the Paraguayans "would have cleared the river". He went further:

The war, indeed, was altogether premature: had the cuirassed ships and Whitworths ordered by the Marshal-President begun the campaign, he might now have supplied the place of Mexico with a third great Latin empire.

Instead, at an early stage of the war Paraguay's wooden vessels, only one of which had been built as a warship, were defeated by a Brazilian wooden flotilla at the Battle of the Riachuelo and so the River Paraguay was blockaded by the Brazilian navy, and the armoured ships that he had ordered could neither be delivered nor paid for. Brazil negotiated with the shipbuilders to transfer and complete the work-in-progress and eventually used the same ironclads to defeat Humaitá.

== Upshot ==
A traditional view is that after the death of the cautious López I, his son paid not enough attention to his father's dying words: to try to settle disputes with Brazil with the pen, not the sword. He was induced by the Uruguayan government to intervene in the Uruguayan War, which he did on 13 November 1864 by firing across the bows of and seizing the Brazilian government ship the Marques de Olinda as she was proceeding upriver on her monthly voyage to the Mato Grosso; he proceeded to seize the Mato Grosso itself. According to the American ambassador to Paraguay, Charles A. Washburn, López explained his seizure of the Brazilian ship by saying "with more candor than discretion" that only by a war could the attention and respect of the world be secured to Paraguay; that although Paraguay was a small power in comparison with Brazil, it had "advantages of position" that gave her an equality of strength; and that the Paraguayan troops would be already "fortified and intrenched" before the Brazilians could arrive in any considerable numbers.

Encouraged by the sluggish response of Brazil, infuriated by the mockery of the Buenos Aires press, and impatient at Argentina's refusal to permit him to invade a further Brazilian province through sovereign Argentine territory, on 13 April 1865, López fired upon and seized two small Argentine naval vessels moored in the port of Corrientes and proceeded to take the Argentine province of that name and to make Paraguayan paper currency compulsory on pain of death. The resulting War of the Triple Alliance was to destroy his country.

=== Treaty of the Triple Alliance ===
The Treaty of the Triple Alliance against Paraguay was signed 1 May 1865 and specifically stated that Humaitá must be destroyed and never rebuilt. Article 18 provided that the terms of the treaty should be kept secret until its "principal objective" had been attained; Consul Thomas Hutchinson thought that referred not to the deposition of López but to the demolition of Humaitá. Numerous political objectives are expressly mentioned in the treaty but no other military ones.

On the same day, the Allied High Command agreed a strategic plan, the first point of which read:

The objective of the campaign operations − to which [all] military operations and [invasion] routes must be subordinated − should be the position of Humaitá.

And:-

The distance from Paso de Patria [the invasion point] to Humaitá is only seven leagues by land, and whatever be the difficulties of the terrain, the short distance, time and the ability to hit the enemy with the ironclads will compensate for it.

== Effectiveness in practice ==
Despite Burton's strictures the Fortress of Humaitá was a serious obstacle to the Allies' plans to proceed upriver. On it being announced in Buenos Aires that Paraguay had fired upon and seized the Argentine naval vessels, President Mitre told a furious crowd that:

In twenty-four hours we shall be in the barracks, in a fortnight at Corrientes, and in three months at Asunción.

In fact, the Allies did not occupy the Paraguayan capital until 5 January 1869, nearly four years after Mitre's speech. The main reason was the Humaitá complex.

It may have been "only seven leagues by land" from Paso de Patria to Humaitá, but it was land that it was necessary to traverse. After expelling the Paraguayans from Argentine soil the Allies landed in Paraguay and occupied Paso de Patria on 23 April 1866. They did not capture Humaitá until 5 August 1868. The Humaitá phase of the Paraguayan war is outside the scope of this Article. However, B.C. MacDermot thus summarised the difficulties:

[T]he terrain conferred a huge advantage on the defence. Below and around Humaitá was a conglomeration of lagoons, marshes and patches of jungle connected by narrow strips of terra firma which the attacking side had to squeeze through on a narrow front... [A]t only two points was an advance inland possible: at Curupayty to the south and Tayí to the north of Humaitá. Behind the natural defences lay the earthworks of Humaitá, with its long outer perimeter touching on Curupaty, and a smaller fort Timbó on the Chaco side of the river. To add to their difficulties the allies found that the ironclads were not as effective as their reputation had led them to hope. They could not move far ahead of their lines of supply. The Paraguayan artillery could not sink them but it could disable them enough to put them out of action. Below the waterline they were exposed to mines and torpedoes. They could be stopped by underwater obstructions and booms. Their ability to manoeuvre depended excessively on the level of the river, which between September and March could fall as much as fourteen feet, restricting the navigable channels and increasing the perils from obstructions or sandbanks.

These difficulties are almost sufficient to account for the failure of the allies to bring about the quick decision that their overwhelming superiority in numbers and armament entitled them to hope for, but they were also handicapped by divided leadership, national jealousies and as time went on a sinking morale. For the Paraguayans these were the years in which the National Epic, as it is to-day called, was forged out of countless deeds of heroism performed under leaders whose names are known in every home.

An additional cause of delay, according to Professor Williams, was the long pause after the debacle of the Battle of Curupayty when the Allies overestimated the strength both of the opposing army and of Humaitá: they allowed López almost a year to rebuild his forces, devastated at the Battle of Tuyutí.

== Endgame ==
It took the Allies more than two years to go the "seven leagues" from the invasion point at 1 (map) to the fall of the fortress at 2. Note the scale on the map (sketched by Commander A.J. Kennedy, R.N., whose gunboat was observing the war) is only 10 miles.

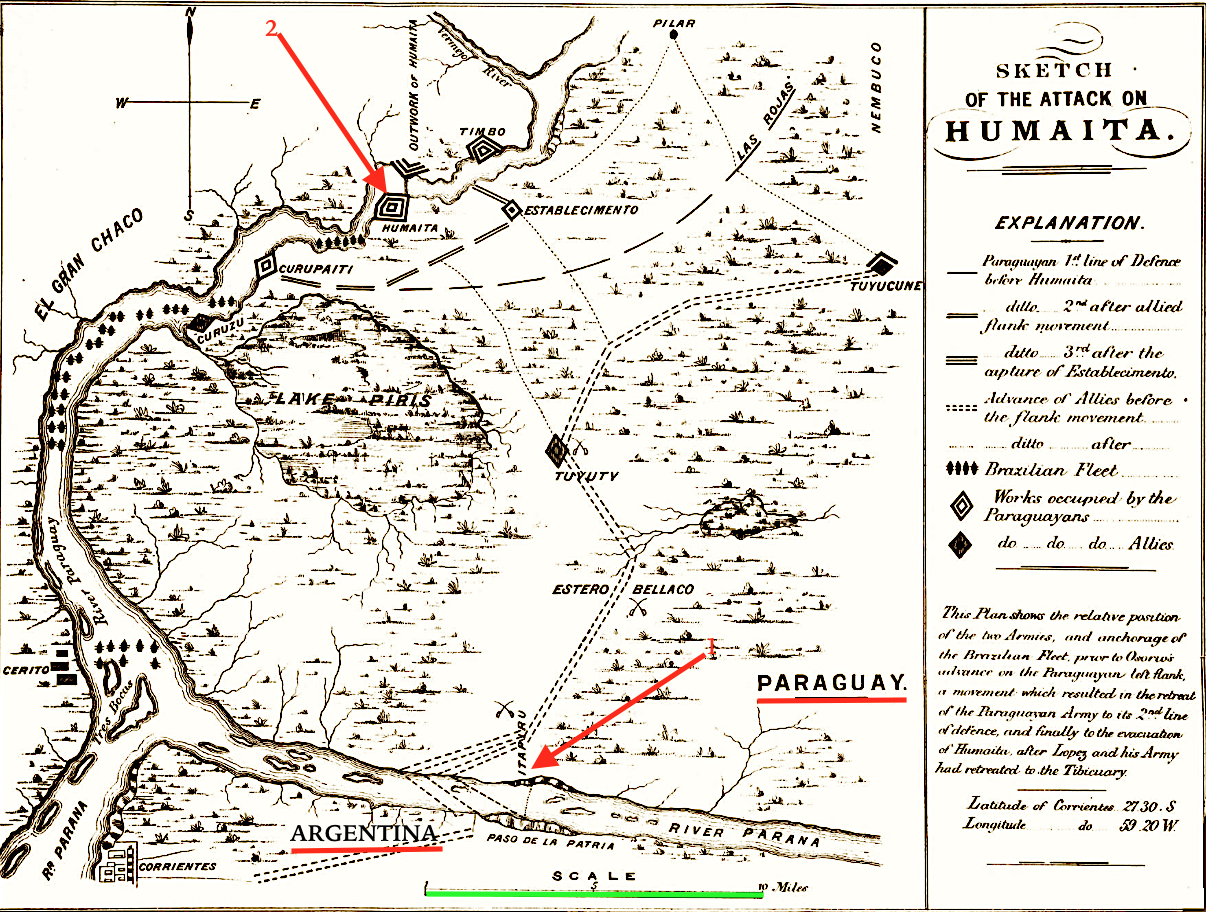
Endgame. The Allies close in.

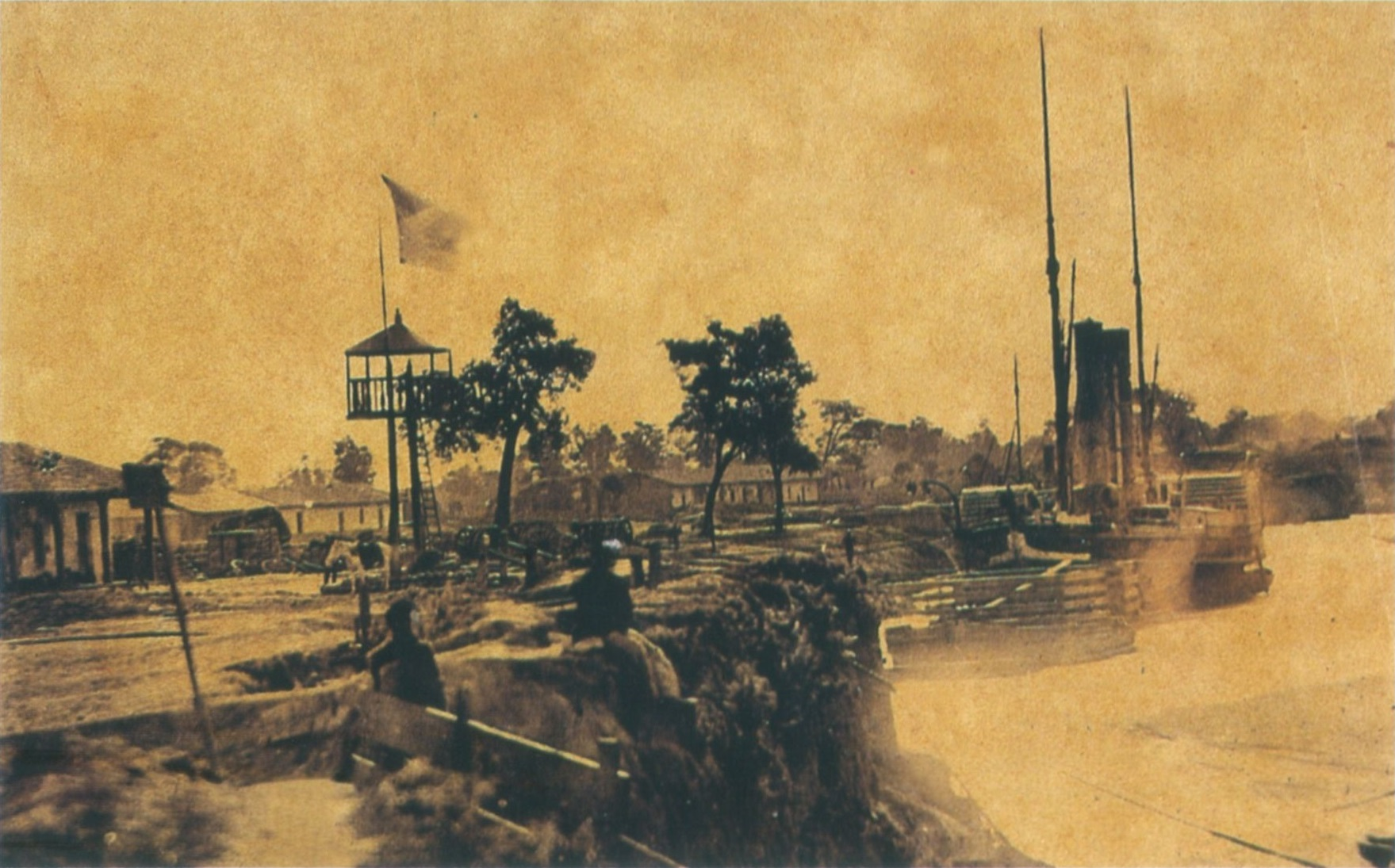
Captured. Brazilian flag flies over its watchtower.

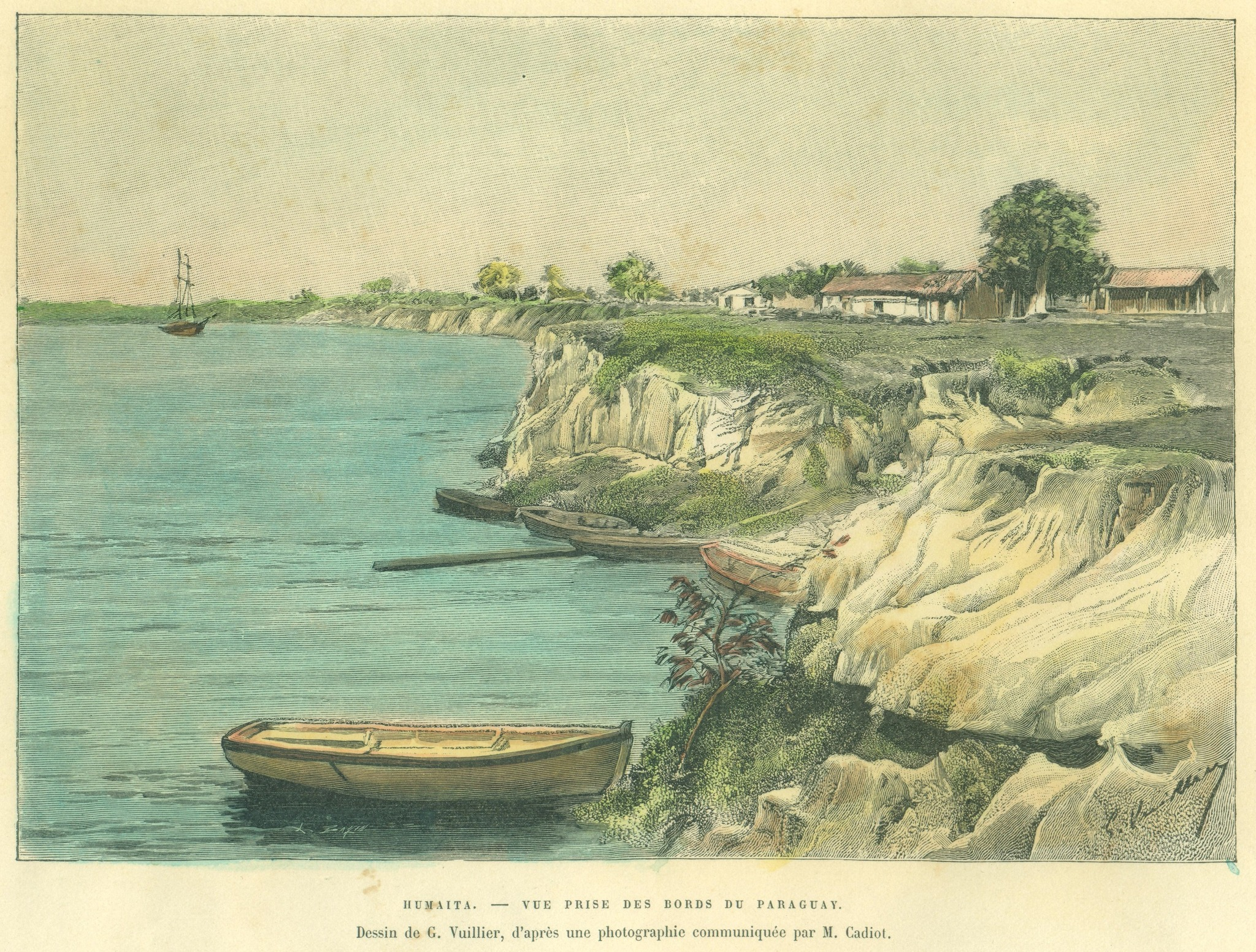
Remains c. 1894

On 19 February 1868 when the river was unusually high six Brazilian ironclad vessels were ordered to dash past Humaitá during the hours of darkness, which they did with no great difficulty because by then the chain boom was anyway lying in the river bed.

The Paraguayans found it increasingly hard to resuppy Humaitá and it was starved out. The fortress was finally captured in the Siege of Humaitá, an operation that culminated on 5 August 1868. It was razed pursuant to the Treaty of the Triple Alliance.

It was the decisive year of the Paraguayan War.

== In literature ==
The second volume of the Argentine novelist Manuel Gálvez's trilogy Escenas de la Guerra del Paraguay is set in the Fortress of Humaitá.

== See also ==
- Passage of Humaitá
- Siege of Humaitá
- Paraguayan War
- Treaty of the Triple Alliance
- Francisco Solano López

== Sources ==
- Bakewell, Peter (2010). A History of Latin America to 1825, 3rd ed. United Kingdom: John Wiley & Sons. ISBN 978-1-4051-8368-0.
- Benítes, Gergorio (1904). La triple alianza de 1865: Escapada de un desastre en la Guerra de Invasion al Paraguay. Asunción: Talleres Mons. Lasagna.
- Bethell, Leslie (1996). "The Paraguayan War (1864–1870)". London: Institute of Latin American Studies. ISBN 1-900039-08-7., , retrieved May 2016.
- Box, Pelham Horton (1927). The Origins of the Paraguayan War – Part I. Urbana: University of Illinois.
- Brassey, Thomas (1882). The British Navy: Its Strength, Resources and Administration, vol. II. London: Longmans, Green, and Co.
- Burton, Captain Sir Richard (1870). Letters From the Battle-Fields of Paraguay. London: Tinsley Brothers.
- Centurión, Juan Crisóstomo (1894). Memorias del coronel Juan Crisóstomo Centurión ó sea Reminiscencias históricas sobre la guerra del Paraguay (in Spanish). Vol. 2. Buenos Aires: Impr. de J. A. Berra.
- Campbell; et al. (1979). Chesneau, Roger; Koleśnik, Eugène M. (eds.). Conway's All the World's Fighting Ships 1860–1905. London: Conway Maritime Press. ISBN 0851771335.
- Constitution of Argentina (1994 revision, in Spanish), Wikisource , retrieved 29 April 2015.
- Cooney, Jerry W. (2004). "Economy and Manpower: Paraguay at War, 1864–69". In Kraay, Hendrik; Whigham, Thomas L. (eds.). I Die With My Country:Perspectives on the Paraguayan War, 1864–1870. University of Nebraska Press. pp. 23–43. ISBN 0803227620.
- Denison, John Ledyard (1862). A Pictorial History of the Navy of the United States. San Francisco, Ca.: Henry Hill for Francis Dewing.
- Doratioto, Francisco (2005). "GUERRA E REGENERAÇÃO: TRÊS ESTUDOS SOBRE O PARAGUAI". Diálogos - Revista do Departamento de História e do Programa de Pós-Graduação em História (in Portuguese). 9 (2): 79–87. ISSN 1415-9945.
- Doratioto, Francisco (2008). Maldita Guerra (in Spanish). Buenos Aires: Emecé Editores. ISBN 978-950-04-2574-2.
- Dudley, William S. (1976). "Professionalization and Politicization as Motivational Factors in the Brazilian Army Coup of 15 November, 1889". Journal of Latin American Studies. 8 (1). Cambridge University Press: 101–125. JSTOR 156206.
- "El Semanario de Avisos y Conocimientos Útiles". Asunción. 11 Apr 1857.
- Francis, John Michael (2006). Iberia and the Americas, volume 1. ABC-CLIO. ISBN 1851094210.
- Gálvez, Manuel (1928–29). Escenas de la Guerra del Paraguay (in Spanish). Buenos Aires: Librería y editorial "La Facultad". (In three volumes: I. Caminos de la muerte. II. Humaitá. III. Jornadas de agonía.)
- Garmendía, José Ignacio (1901). Campaña de Humaitá (in Spanish). Buenos Aires: Peuser.
- Graz, George A. (1998). "COMMENTS AND CORRECTIONS: PARAGUAYAN IRONCLADS". Warship International. 35 (2). International Naval Research Organization: 210–211. JSTOR 44892545.
- Haydon, F. Stansbury (1939). "Documents Relating to the First Military Balloon Corps Organized in South America: The Aeronautic Corps of the Brazilian Army, 1867–1868". The Hispanic American Historical Review. 19 (4). Duke University Press: 504–517. JSTOR 2507087.
- Hooker, Terry D. (2008). The Paraguayan War. Nottingham: Foundry Books. ISBN 1-901543-15-3.
- Hutchinson, Thomas J (1868). The Paraná, With Incidents of the Paraguayan War, and South American Recollections From 1861 to 1868. London: Edward Stanford.
- Institution of Mechanical Engineers (1866). Proceedings. Birmingham, England.
- Jaceguay, A.; De Oliveira, Vidal (1900). Quatro Séculos de Actividade Marítima: Portugal e Brasil (in Portuguese). Rio de Janeiro: Imprenta Nacional.
- Jourdan, Emilio Carlos (1871a). Guerra do Paraguay (in Portuguese). Rio de Janeiro: Perseverança.
- Jourdan, Emilio Carlos (1871b). Atlas Historico da Guerra do Paraguay. Rio de Janeiro: Lithographia Imperial do Eduardo Rensburg.
- Kennedy, Commander A. J. (1869). La Plata, Brazil and Paraguay During the Present War. London: Edward Stanford.
- MacDermott, Brian Charles (1976). Historical Introduction. In Plá, Josefina The British In Paraguay, 1850-1870. The Richmond Publishing Co in association with St Antony's College, Oxford. ISBN 0855461969.
- Masterman, George Frederick (1870). Seven Eventful Years in Paraguay: A Narrative of Personal Experience Amongst the Paraguayans (2 ed.). London: Sampson, Low, Son, and Marston.
- Mulhall, Michael G. (1864). The Cotton Fields of Paraguay and Corrientes. Buenos Aires: The Standard Printing Office.
- Nakayama, Eduardo; Nakayama, Mateo (2013). "El Perímetro Fortificado de Humaitá. Reconstrucción Virtual" (in Spanish). Montevideo: Instituto Militar de Estudios Superiores.
- Nickson, R. Andrew (2015). Historical Dictionary of Paraguay. Rowman & Littlefield. ISBN 0810879646.
- Niemeyer, Conrado Jacó de (1867). Uma idéa das posições que occupāo os BELIGERANTES NO PARAGUAY pelo capitão d'Engenheiros Conrado de Niemeyer em commisāo na vanguarda do Exercito Brasileiro, setembro de 1867 (Map). Imperial Instituto Artistico. Archived from the original on 2017-11-13.
- Page, Thomas Jefferson (1859). La Plata, the Argentine Confederation and Paraguay. London: Trubner & Co.
- Pakenham, F. (1866). Pakenham to Thornton, June 7, 1865. In "Correspondence Respecting Hostilities in the River Plate (In continuation of Papers presented to Parliament on the 30th June, 1865). Harrison and Sons.
- Pastore, Mario (1994). "State-Led Industrialisation: The Evidence on Paraguay, 1852-1870". Journal of Latin American Studies. 26 (2): 295–324. JSTOR 157945.
- Patent Office (1869). Patents for Inventions: Abridgements of Specifications Relating to Ship Building, Repairing, Sheathing, Launching, &c, Part II – A.D. 1861–1866. Londo: Office of the Commissioners of Patents for Inventions.
- Plá, Josefina (1970). "Los Británicos en Paraguay (1850–1870)". Revista de Historia de América (in Spanish). 70. Pan American Institute of Geography and History: 339–391. JSTOR 20138938.
- Plá, Josefina (1976). The British in Paraguay 1850–1870. Translated by MacDermott, B.C. The Richmond Publishing Co in association with St Antony's College, Oxford.
- Sarreal, Julia (2014). The Guaraní and Their Missions: a socioeconomic history. Stanford University Press. ISBN 9780804785976.
- Scheina, Robert L. (2003). Latin America's Wars: The Age of the Caudillo, 1791–1899. Washington, D.C.: Potomac Books, Inc. ISBN 9781574884500.
- Schneider, Louis (1872). Der Krieg der Triple-Allianz (Kaiserthum Brasilien, Argentinische Conföderation und Republik Banda Oriental del Uruguay) gegen die Regierung der Republik Paraguay (in German). Vol. 1. Berlin: B. Behr's Buchhandlung (E. Bock). (In three volumes.)
- Schneider, L. (1902). A Guerra Da Triplice Alliança Contra A Goberno Da Republica Do Paraguay 1864–1870 (in Portuguese). Vol. 2. Trans. Nogueira. Rio de Janeiro: H. Garnier.
- Sondhaus, Lawrence (2012). Naval Warfare, 1815–1914. Routledge. ISBN 1134609949.
- Tasso Fragoso, Augusto (1956a). História da Guerra entre a Tríplice Aliança e o Paraguai (in Portuguese). Vol. 2 (2 ed.). Rio de Janeiro; Sāo Paulo: Livraria Freitas Bastos S.A.
- Tasso Fragoso, Augusto (1956b). História da Guerra entre a Tríplice Aliança e o Paraguai (in Portuguese). Vol. 3 (2 ed.). Rio de Janeiro; Sāo Paulo: Livraria Freitas Bastos S.A.
- "The Standard". Buenos Aires. 14 May 1862.
- "The Times". London. 7 April 1868.
- "The Times". London. 3 September 1868.
- Thompson, George (1869). The War In Paraguay: With a Historical Sketch of the Country and Its People and Notes Upon the Military Engineering of the War. London: Longman's, Green and Co. (Note: Not all bound copies of this important source book have a complete set of maps. A scanned version of a relatively good copy at the Boston Public Library was accessed at the Internet Archive on 29 April 2015. It lacks pages 71–74 but those are not about Humaitá.)
- Warren, Harris Gaylord (1982). Paraguay: An Informal History. Greenwood Press. ISBN 0-313-23651-8.
- Warren, Harris Gaylord (1985). "Roberto Adolfo Chodasiewicz: A Polish Soldier of Fortune in the Paraguayan War". The Americas. 41 (3). Cambridge University Press: 1–19. JSTOR 1007097.
- Washburn, Charles (1871a). The History of Paraguay: With Notes of Personal Observations, and Reminiscences of Diplomacy Under Difficulties. Vol. I. Boston: Lee and Shephard.
- Washburn, Charles (1871b). The History of Paraguay: With Notes of Personal Observations, and Reminiscences of Diplomacy Under Difficulties. Vol. II. Boston: Lee and Shephard.
- Whigham, Thomas L. (2002). The Paraguayan War, Volume 1, Causes and Conflict. Lincoln and London: University of Nebraska Press. ISBN 0-8032-4786-9.
- Whigham, Thomas L. (2004). "The Paraguayan War: A Catalyst for Nationalism in South America". In Kraay, Hendrik; Whigham, Thomas L. (eds.). I Die With My Country:Perspectives on the Paraguayan War, 1864–1870. University of Nebraska Press. pp. 179–198. ISBN 0803227620.
- Williams, John Hoyt (1979). The Rise and Fall of the Paraguayan Republic, 1800–1870. Austin, Texas: Institute of Latin American Studies: The University of Texas Press. ISBN 0-292-77017-0.
- Williams, John Hoyt (1972). "Woodbine Parish and the "Opening" of Paraguay". Proceedings of the American Philosophical Society. American Philosophical Society: 343–349. JSTOR 985904.
- Williams, John Hoyt (1977). "Foreign Tecnicos and the Modernization of Paraguay". Journal of Interamerican Studies and World Affairs. Center for Latin American Studies at the University of Miami: 233–257. JSTOR 174705.
- Williams, John Hoyt (1978). "A Forgotten Source: Paraguayan Periódicos and Reviews". The Americas. 34 (3). Cambridge University Press: 407–427. JSTOR 981315.
- Williams, John Hoyt (1980). "The Undrawn Line: Three Centuries of Strife on the Paraguayan-Mato Grosso Frontier". Luso-Brazilian Review. 17 (1). University of Wisconsin Press: 17–40. JSTOR 3513374.
