= Michael George Mulhall =

Irish writer, journalist, editor and statistician (1836–1900)

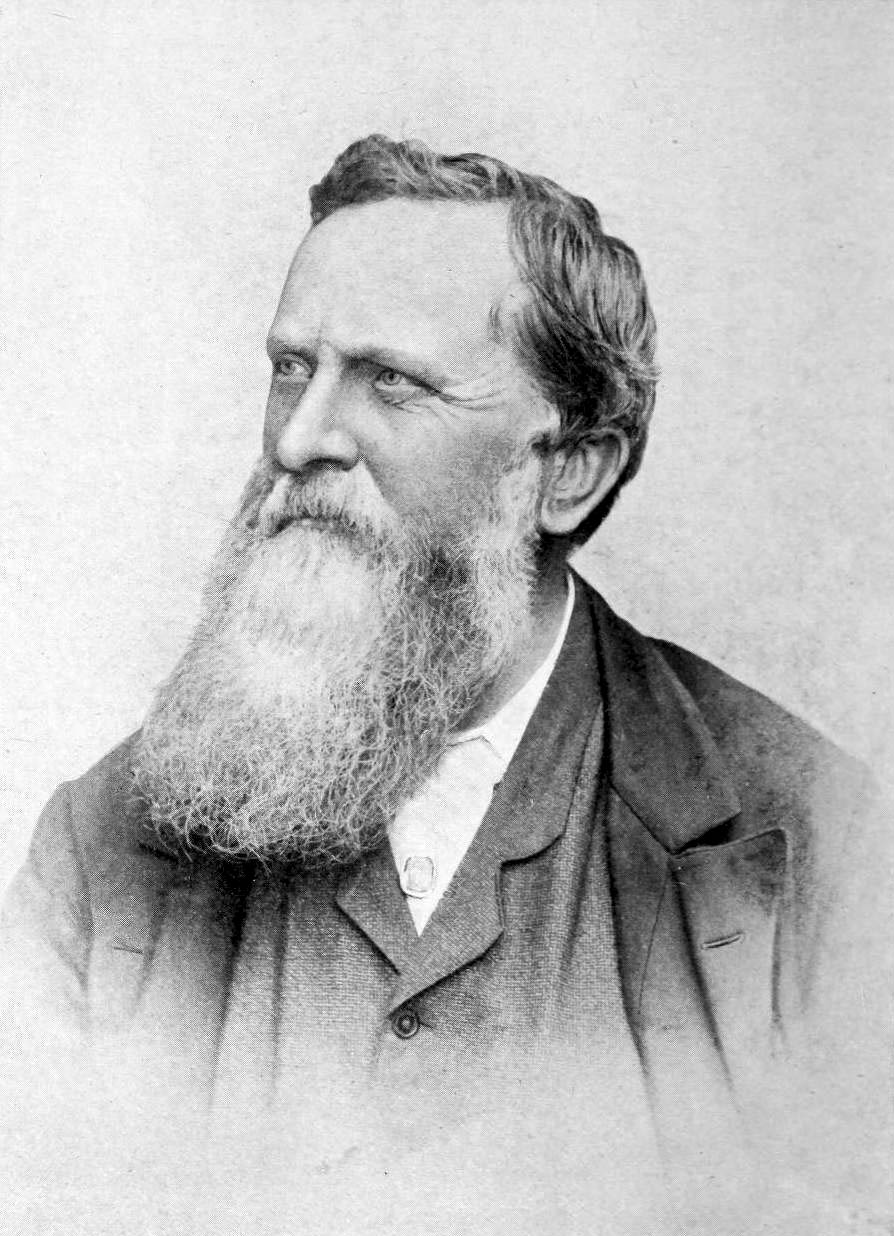
- Portrait of Mulhall published on Explorers in the New World, 1909
- Born: 29 September 1836; Dublin
- Died: 13 December 1900 (aged 64); Dublin
- Occupations: Economist; Newspaper editor
- Known for: Co-founder of The Standard

Michael George Mulhall (1836–1900) was an Irish author, statistician, economist and newspaper editor. He co-founded The Standard, which in 1862 became the first English-language newspaper to be published daily in South America. He co-authored the first English-language book published in that continent, The Handbook of the River Plate, a work that went to six editions, was widely consulted by immigrants and is now a historical sourcebook. His Dictionary of Statistics (1883 and later editions) became a standard work of reference.

== Life ==
Mulhall was born on 29 September 1836 in Dublin, Ireland, the third son of Thomas Mulhall. He was educated for the priesthood at the Irish College, Rome, but not having the vocation emigrated to Argentina to work with his brother Edward Thomas Mulhall, then a large sheep farmer in that country. In 1861 the Mulhall brothers founded the Buenos Aires Standard, which next year became a daily; it was the preferred newspaper of the Anglo-Argentine community and claimed to be the only English-language daily newspaper to be published south of the equator. (A third brother Francis Healey Mulhall also emigrated to Argentina and edited the ‘’Southern Cross’’, a newspaper of the Irish-Argentine community.)

By 1864, Mulhall, "despite his relative youth, was regarded as a spokesman for the entire British community in the region".

In 1878 (another source says 1868), Mulhall married Marion McMurrough Murphy, herself an author (Between the Amazon and the Andes; Explorers in the New World) who cooperated with him closely on his statistical work. He died in Dublin on 13 December 1900.

== Works published in volume form (incomplete) ==
(All of the following were accessed at the Internet Archive on 1–3 May 2015.)

- The Cotton Fields of Paraguay and Corrientes (1864, Standard Printing Office, Buenos Aires).
- Rio Grande Do Sul and Its German Colonies (1873, Longmans, Green and Co, London.)
- (With E. T. Mulhall) Manual de las repúblicas del Plata. Datos topográficos, históricos y económicos sobre los productos, colonias, empresas, comercio, rentas nacionales, deuda pública, immigración, ciudades, provincias, instituciones, ferro-carriles, bancos, escuelas y literatura de las Repúblicas Argentina, Oriental y Paraguay (Buenos Aires, 1876).
- The Dictionary of Statistics (G. Routledge and Son, London 1886; 1892; 1899; 1903, 1909).
- (With Webb, A.G.) The New Dictionary of Statistics; a complement to the fourth edition of Mulhall's "Dictionary of statistics, 1911.
- Balance-sheet of the World for Ten Years, 1870–1880 (E. Stanford, London 1881).
- Industries and Wealth of Nations, Longmans, Green and Co., 1896.
- (With E. T. Mulhall) Handbook of the River Plate, Standard Printing Office, Buenos Aires 1863 and later editions.
- History of Prices Since the Year 1850 (1885 Longmans, Green and Co, London).
- National Progress in the Queen's Reign, 1837–1897(G. Routledge, London, 1897).
- The English in South America, (Standard Printing Office, Buenos Aires, and E. Stanford, London, 1878).
- The progress of the world in arts, agriculture, commerce, manufactures, instruction, railways, and public wealth since the beginning of the nineteenth century (E. Stanford, London, 1880).
