= The Standard (Buenos Aires) =

Argentine newspaper based in Buenos Aires

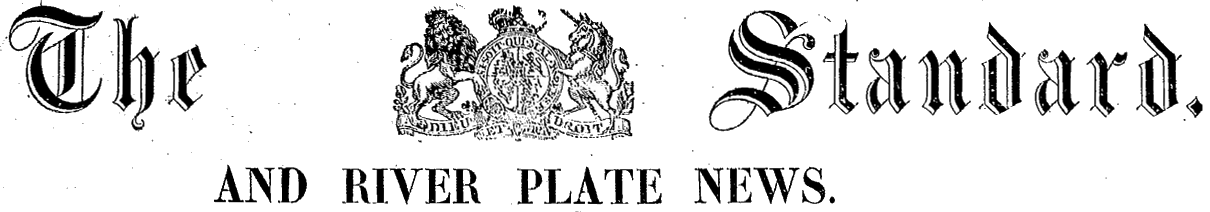

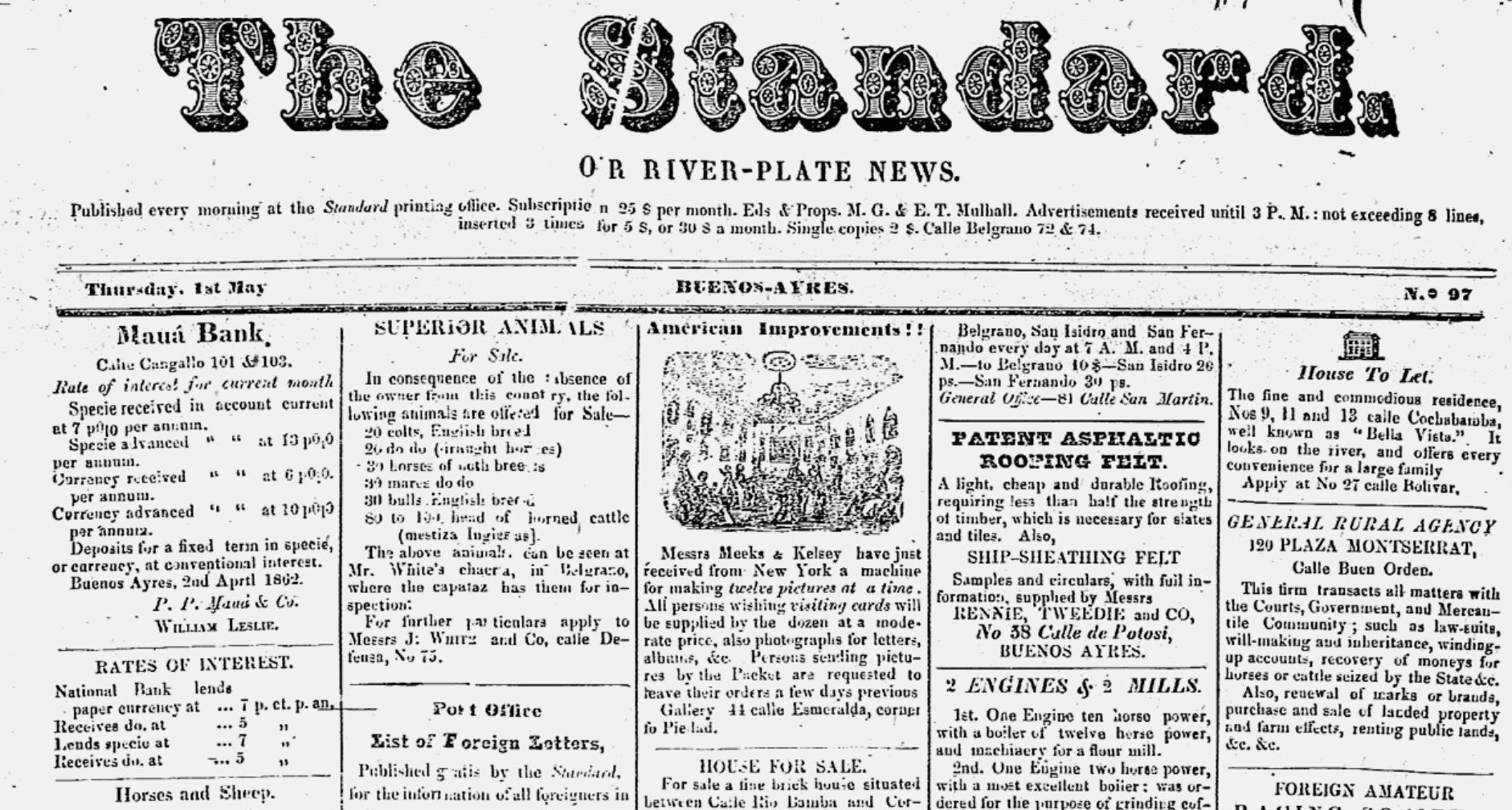
- Front page from May 1, 1862
- Type: Daily newspaper
- Format: Broadsheet
- Founder(s): Edward Mulhall; Michael Mulhall
- Founded: 1861
- Ceased publication: 1959; 67 years ago
- Language: English
- Headquarters: Buenos Aires, Argentina
- OCLC number: 643033664

The Standard (Spanish: El Estandarte) was an Argentine newspaper published in Buenos Aires between 1861 and 1959 which claimed to be the first English daily in the Southern Hemisphere. It was initially published weekly in 1861 as "The Weekly Standard" and in December 1862 became the daily "The Standard and River Plate News". In 1939, the entrepreneur Alfredo Dougall (owner of Radio Excelsior), bought The Standard and in 1943 the name was changed to "The Standard: (El Estandarte)". In 1955 it reverted to weekly publication until it finally closed in 1959.

== History ==
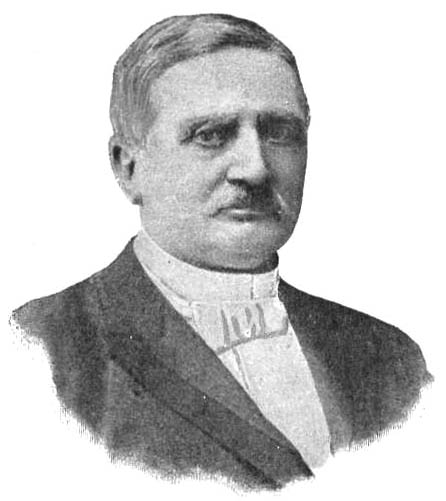
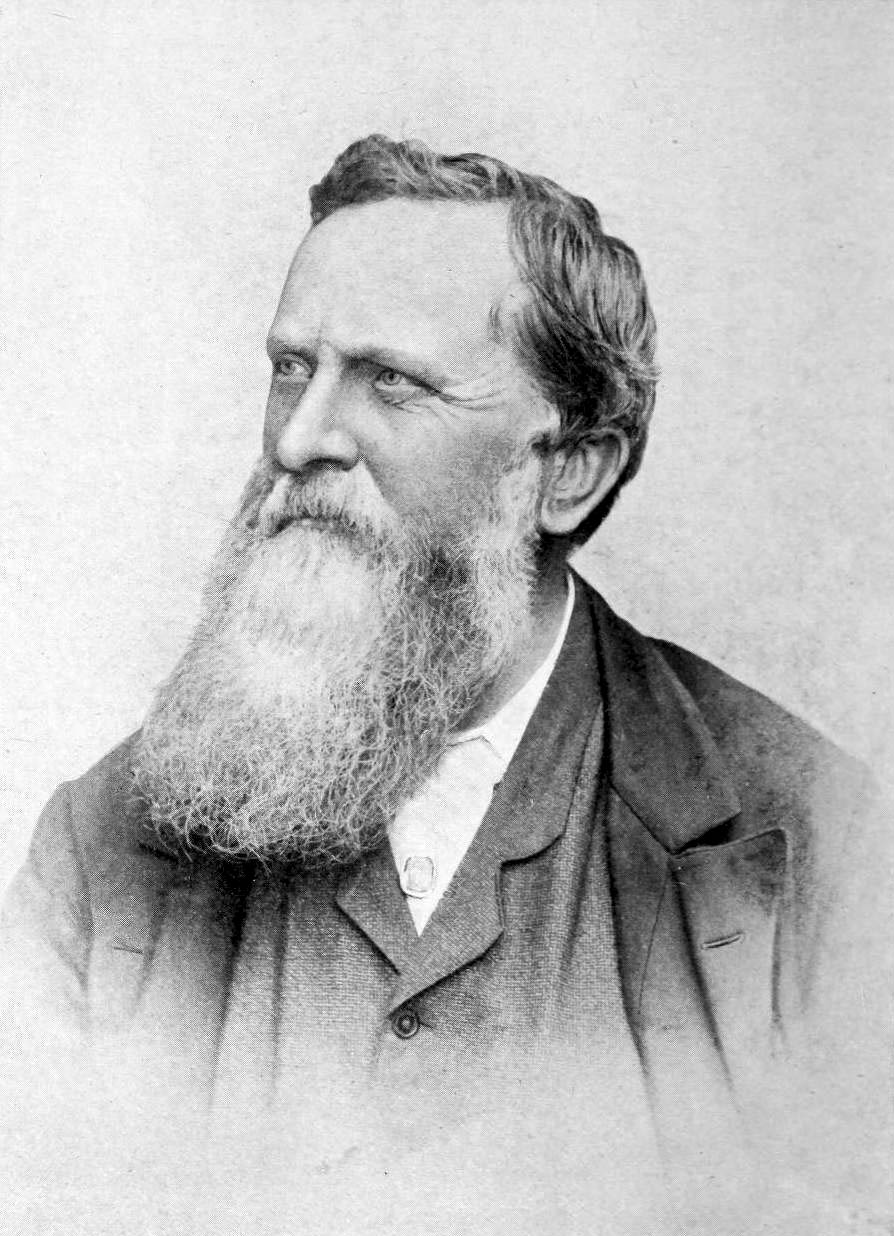
Brothers Edward (left) and Michael Mulhall, founders

Edward Mulhall, born in Dublin in 1832, moved to Argentina initially to breed sheep in Ranchos and Zárate. In 1861, he sold up and joined his brother Michael to found an English-language newspaper for the British community in Argentina.

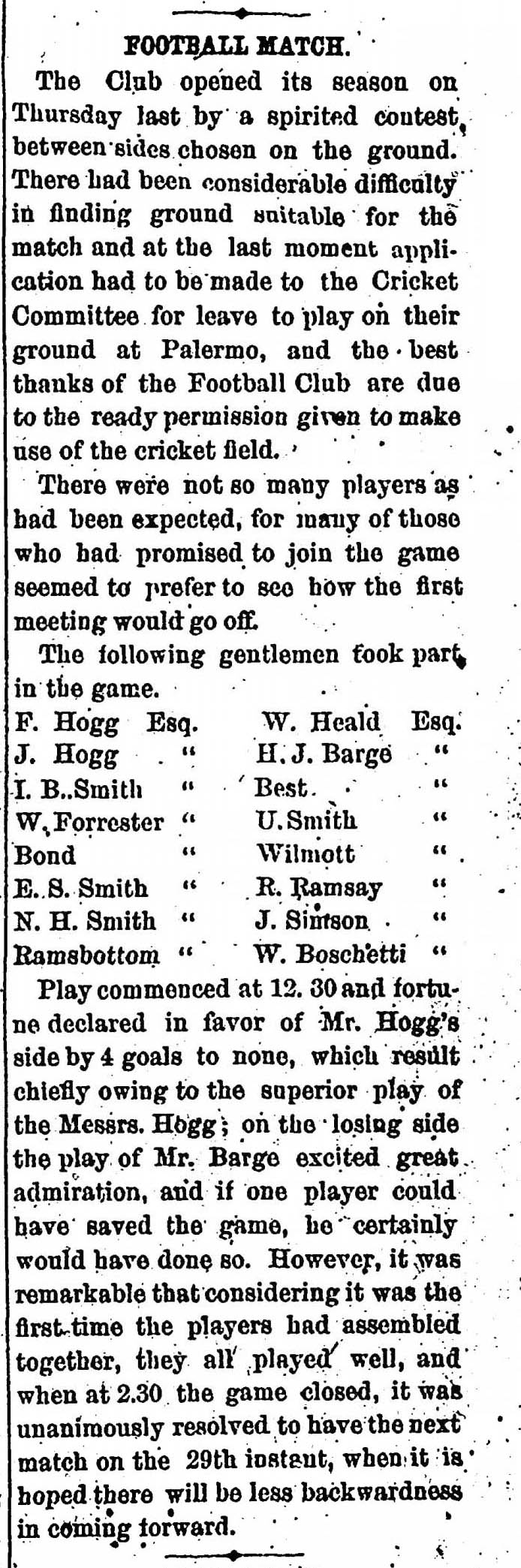
The first football match played in Argentina, as covered by The Standard, June 1867

The Standard claimed to be the first English-language daily newspaper in the southern hemisphere. It became the oldest and most respected English newspaper in South America. "'The Standard of Buenos Aires, long a principal source of Argentine business news, regularly shipped 20,000 copies of its monthly supplement to British investors".

The Standard covered the first football match in Argentina, that took place on 20 June 1867 at the Buenos Aires Cricket Club Ground in Palermo, Buenos Aires. The newspaper subsequently covered other football matches, becoming a pioneer in sports coverage in Argentina.

After the death of Edward Mulhall in 1899 it was managed by his son, another Edward who founded another notable newspaper, La Argentina.

The Max von Buch Library had archived editions of the newspaper, bound in 306 volumes, donated in 1999 by the children of Dougall. A significant source on the history of Argentina, some numbers have been scanned and placed online (but without electronic searchability) by the University of San Andrés Argentina.
