= Brazilian Army =

Land arm of the Brazilian Armed Forces

- Exército Brasileiro
- Founded: 1822 (de facto); 1 December 1824 (de jure)
- Country: Brazil
- Type: Army
- Role: Land warfare
- Size: 212,217 active (2024); Over 1,000,000 reserve (2017)
- Part of: Brazilian Armed Forces
- Command Headquarters: Brasília, Brazil
- Nickname: EB
- Patron: The Duke of Caxias
- Mottos: Braço forte, mão amiga ("Strong arm, friendly hand")
- Colors: sky blue red (heraldic colors)
- March: Canção do Exército ("Army Song")
- Anniversaries: 19 April (Army Day)
- Equipment: See list
- Engagements: List: War of Independence (1822–1825); Confederation of the Equator (1824); Invasion of Chiquitos (1825); Cisplatine War (1825–1828); Mercenaries' Revolt (1828); Cabanada (1832–1835); Malê revolt (1835); Cabanagem (1835–1840); Liberal rebellions (1842); Ragamuffin War (1835–1845); Sabinada (1837–1838); Balaiada (1838–1841); Praieira revolt (1848–1849); Uruguayan Civil War (1839–1851); Platine War (1851–1852); Uruguayan War (1864–1865); Paraguayan War (1864–1870); Revolt of the Muckers (1873–1874); Proclamation of the Republic (1889); Naval Revolts (1893–1894); Federalist Revolution (1893–1895); French intrusion in Amapá (1895); War of Canudos (1896–1897); Acre War (1899–1903); Contestado War (1912–1916); World War I (1917–1918); Tenente revolts (1922–1927); Revolution of 1930 (1930); Constitutionalist Revolution (1932); Communist uprising (1935); World War II (1944–1945); Operation Powerpack (1965–1966); Araguaia Guerrilla War (1972–1974); Operation Traíra (1991); 2006 São Paulo violence outbreak (2006); Rio de Janeiro Security Crisis (2010); UN missions; Suez (1956–1967); Mozambique (1992–1994); Angola (1995–1997); Prevlaka (1996–2002); East Timor (1999–2005); Haiti (2004–2017); South Sudan (2011–2018)
- Website: www.eb.mil.br

Commanders
- Commander-in-chief: President Lula da Silva
- Minister of Defence: José Múcio
- Army Commander: Tomás Ribeiro Paiva

Insignia
- Coat of Arms

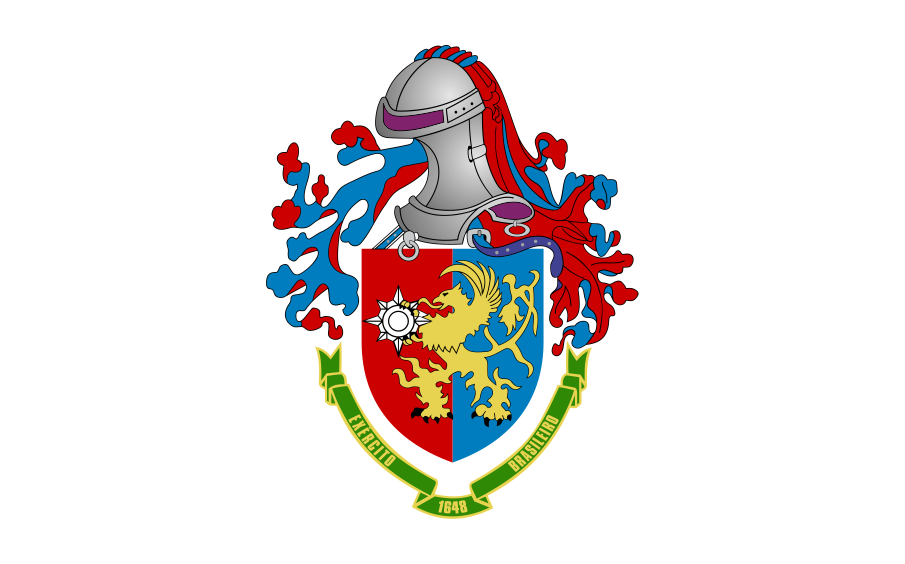
- Flag

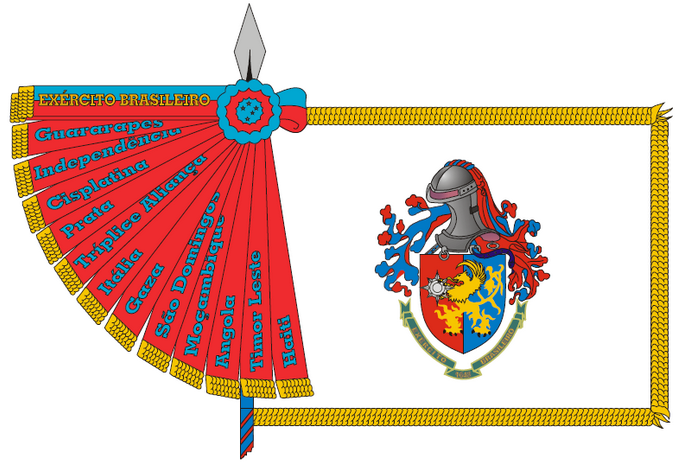
- Standard

The Brazilian Army (Portuguese: Exército Brasileiro; EB) is the branch of the Brazilian Armed Forces responsible, externally, for defending the country in eminently terrestrial operations and, internally, for guaranteeing law, order and the constitutional branches, subordinating itself, in the Federal Government's structure, to the Ministry of Defense, alongside the Brazilian Navy and Air Force. The Military Police (Polícias Militares; PMs) and Military Firefighters Corps (Corpos de Bombeiros Militares; CBMs) are legally designated as reserve and auxiliary forces to the army. Its operational arm is called Land Force. It is the largest army in South America and the largest branch of the Armed Forces of Brazil.

Emerging from the defense forces of the Portuguese Empire in Colonial Brazil as the Imperial Brazilian Army, its two main conventional warfare experiences were the Paraguayan War and the Brazilian Expeditionary Force, and its traditional rival in planning, until the 1990s, was Argentina, but the army also has many peacekeeping operations abroad and internal operations in Brazil. The Brazilian Army was directly responsible for the Proclamation of the Republic and gradually increased its capacity for political action, culminating in the military dictatorship of 1964–1985. Throughout Brazilian history, it safeguarded central authority against separatism and regionalism, intervened where unresolved social issues became violent and filled gaps left by other State institutions.

Changes in military doctrine, personnel, organization and equipment mark the history of the army, with the current phase, since 2010, known as the Army Transformation Process. Its presence strategy extends it throughout Brazil's territory, and the institution considers itself the only guarantee of Brazilianness in the most distant regions of the country. There are specialized forces for different terrains (jungle, mountain, Pantanal, Caatinga and urban) and rapid deployment forces (Army Aviation, Special Operations Command and parachute and airmobile brigades). The armored and mechanized forces, concentrated in Southern Brazil, are the most numerous on the continent, but include many vehicles nearing the end of their life cycle. The basic combined arms unit is the brigade.

Conventional military organizations train reservist corporals and privates through mandatory military service. There is a broad system of instruction, education and research, with the Military Academy of Agulhas Negras (Academia Militar das Agulhas Negras; AMAN) responsible for training the institution's leading elements: officers of infantry, cavalry, engineering, artillery and communications, the Quartermaster Service and the Ordnance Board. This system and the army's own health, housing and religious assistance services, are mechanisms through which it seeks to maintain its distinction from the rest of society.

== Roles ==
The Brazilian Army is one of the three singular forces that make up the Brazilian Armed Forces, alongside the Brazilian Navy and the Air Force, all of which, according to article 142 of Brazil's constitution, act in the defense of the homeland and in guaranteeing constitutional powers and law and order, in addition to subsidiary attributions defined by complementary laws. The army forms the nation's land force, acting primarily in its external defense, but it also has a whole series of internal missions. Its declared objectives include deterring external aggression, gaining prominence on the international stage and contributing to "sustainable development and social peace".

Historically, previous Brazilian constitutions defined both external and internal functions for the Armed Forces. A large workload is dedicated to the doctrine, planning, preparation and execution of law and order operations. The army has a long history of internal defense and state structuring, defending political regimes and addressing threats from unresolved social issues that have resulted in internal conflicts. Throughout Brazil's republican period, it is the most politically powerful of the three forces due to its past positions, its presence throughout the country's territory and its larger strength.

Covering the incompleteness of the national State, filling gaps that should have been satisfied by other institutions, is part of the army's culture. Through its "Presence Strategy", it occupies demographic voids, acting as a "colonizing army", whether through the military colonies it established in the 19th century or through current border posts, and sees itself as the only factor of Brazilianness in these remote regions of the country. Subsidiary roles are constant. Possibly at the expense of preparing for war, the army operates in the scientific-technological and socioeconomic fields, carries out engineering works, receives refugees (Operation Acolhida) and distributes water in Northeastern Brazil (Operation Pipa), among many other missions.

Examples of army operations

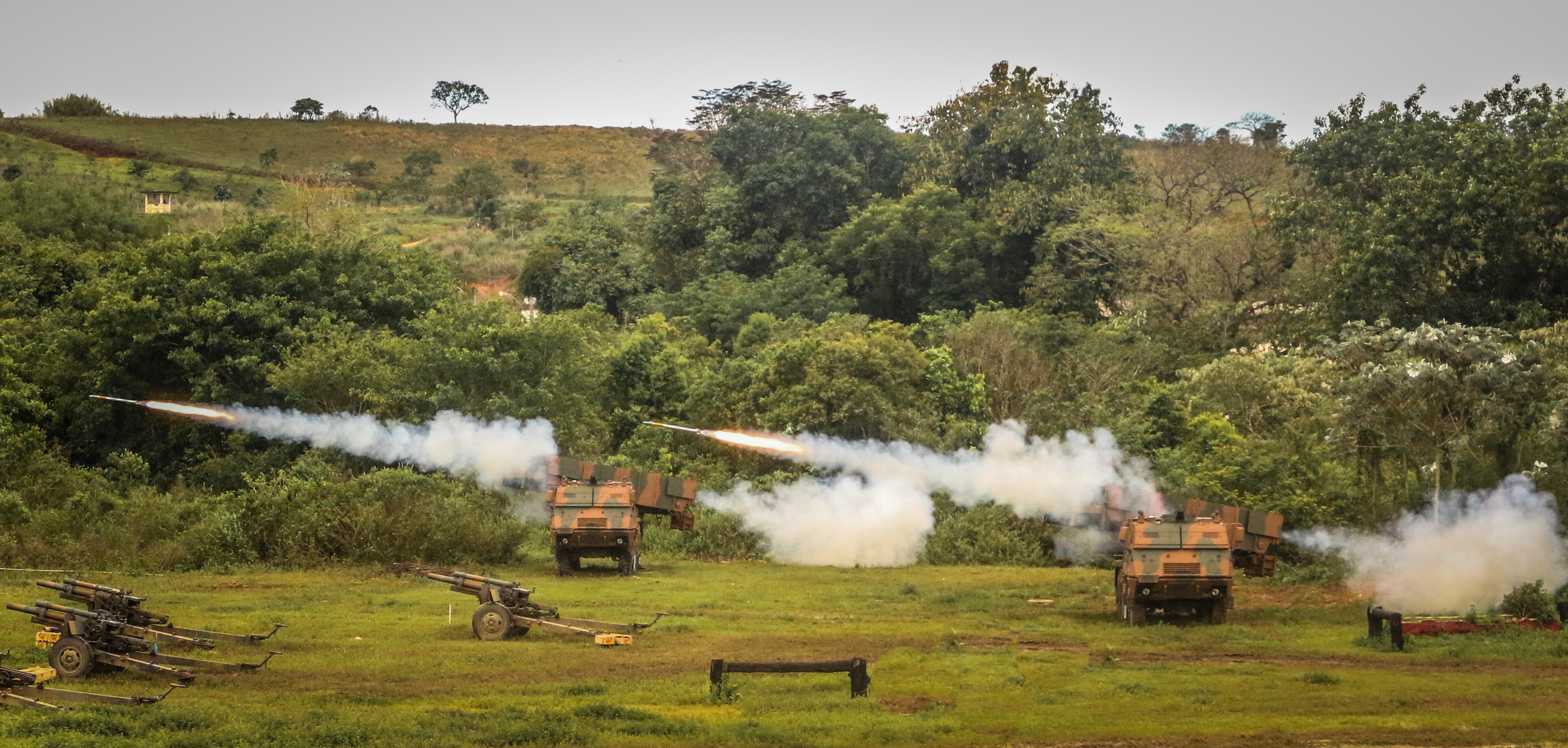
Field maneuvers

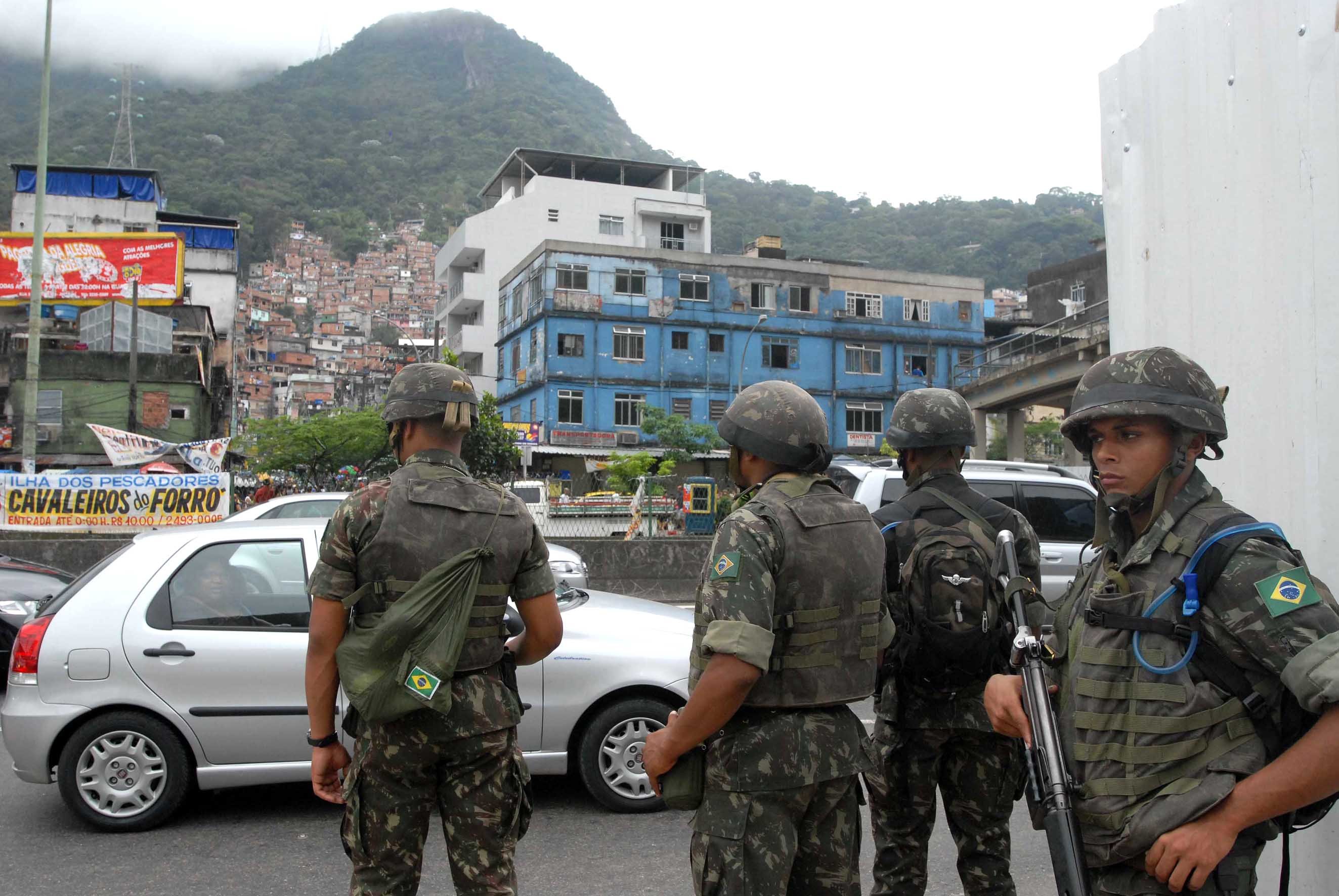
Occupation of Rocinha in 2008

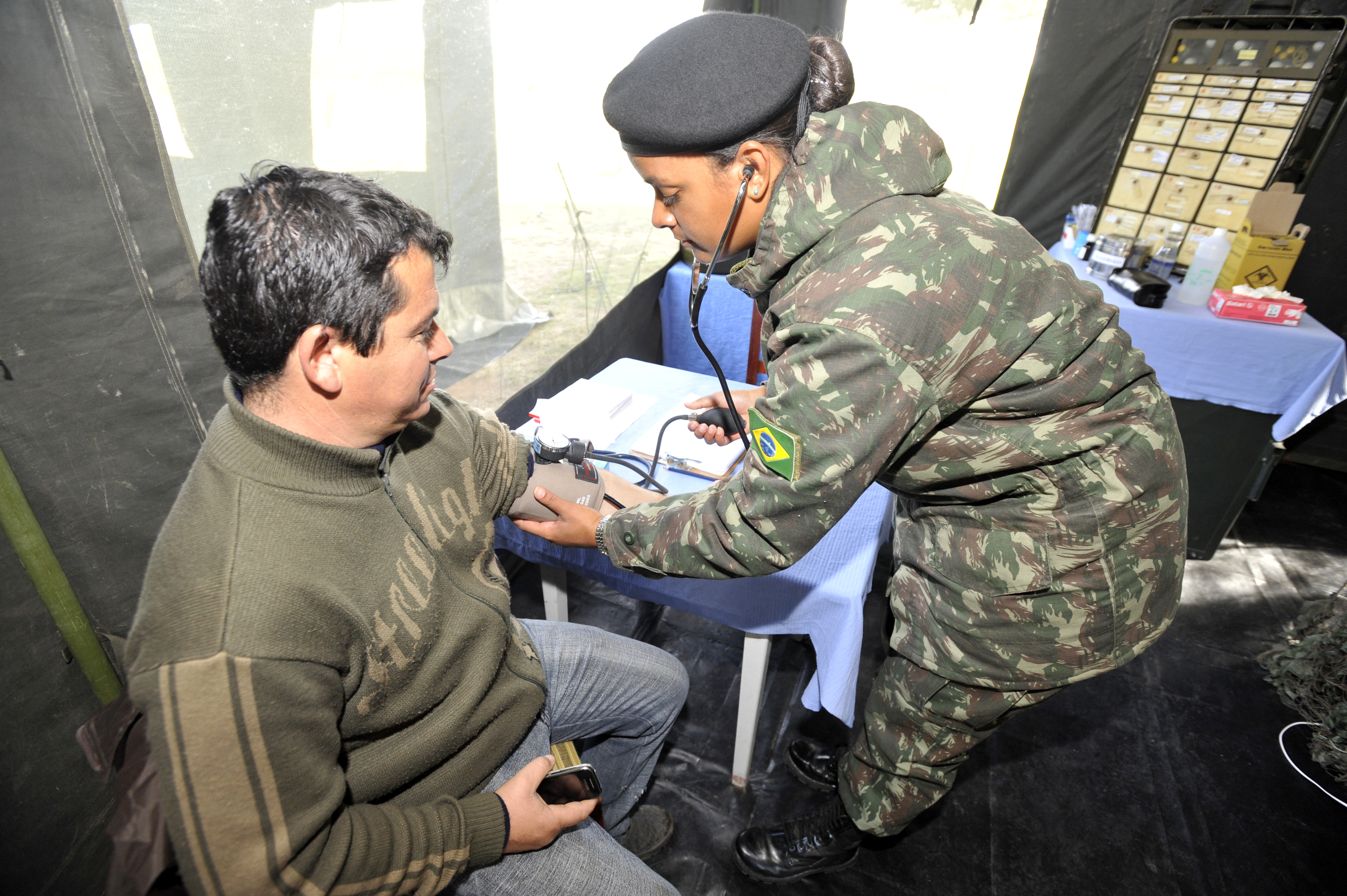
Medical assistance

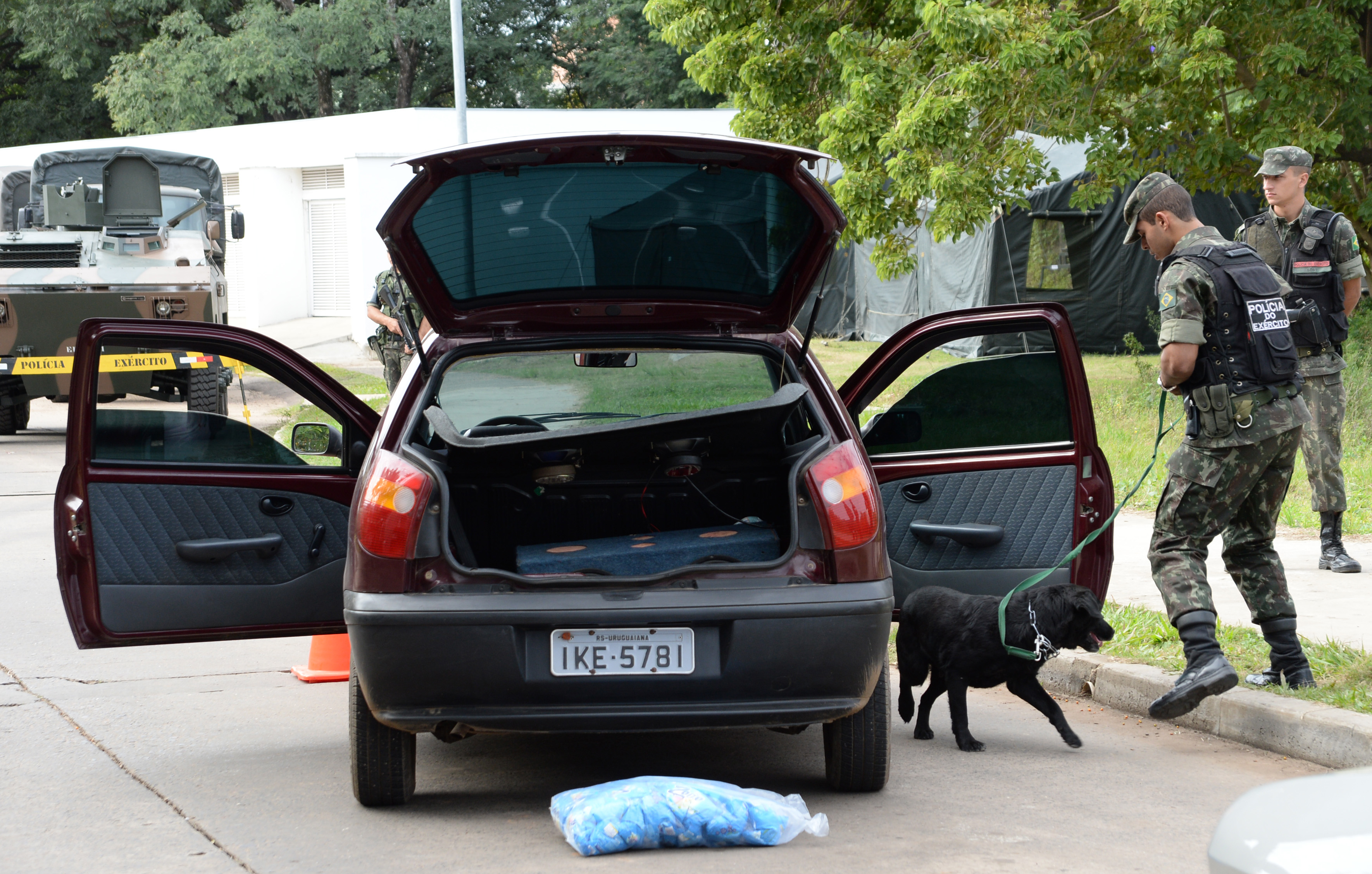
Road inspection at the borders

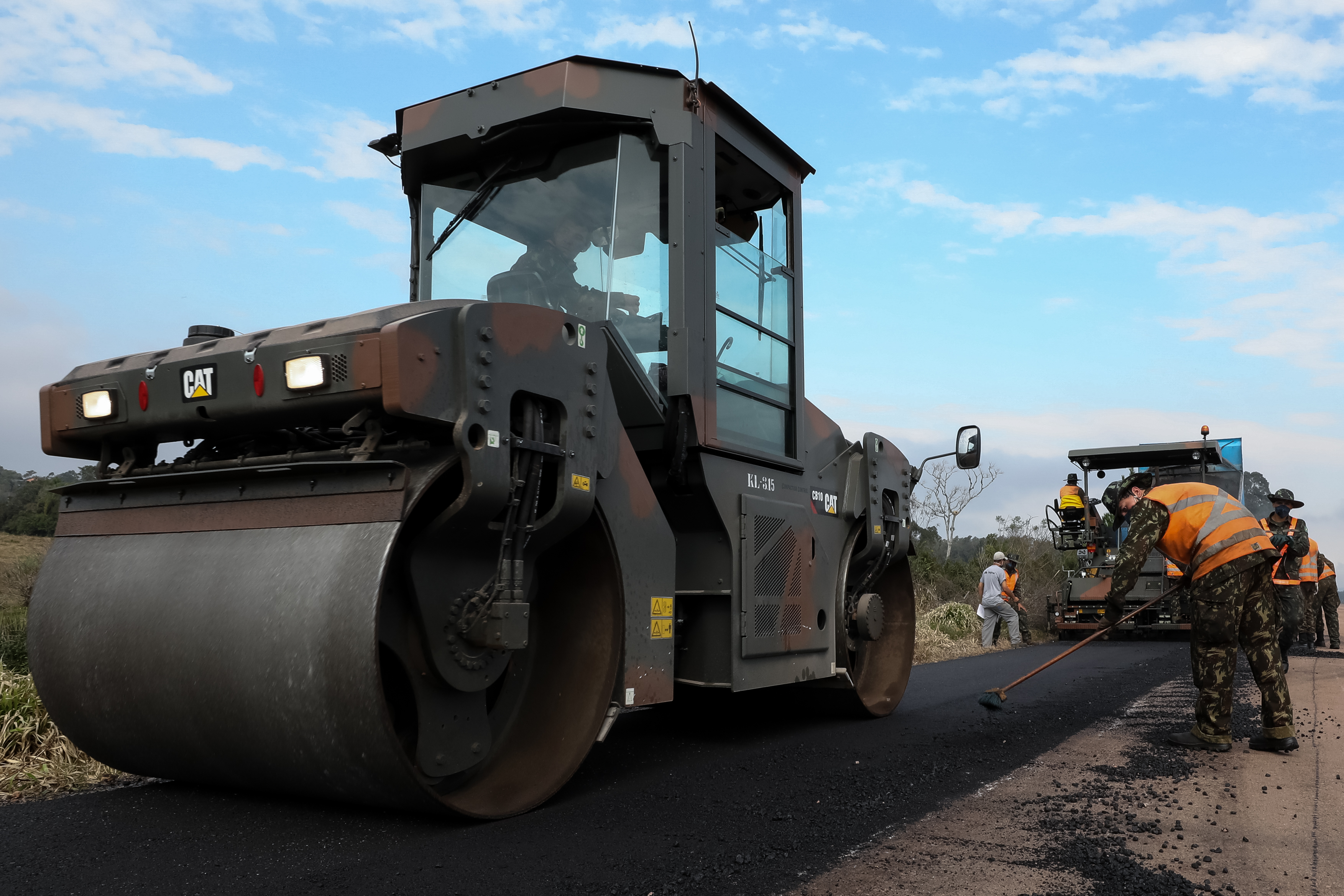
Highway works

== History ==
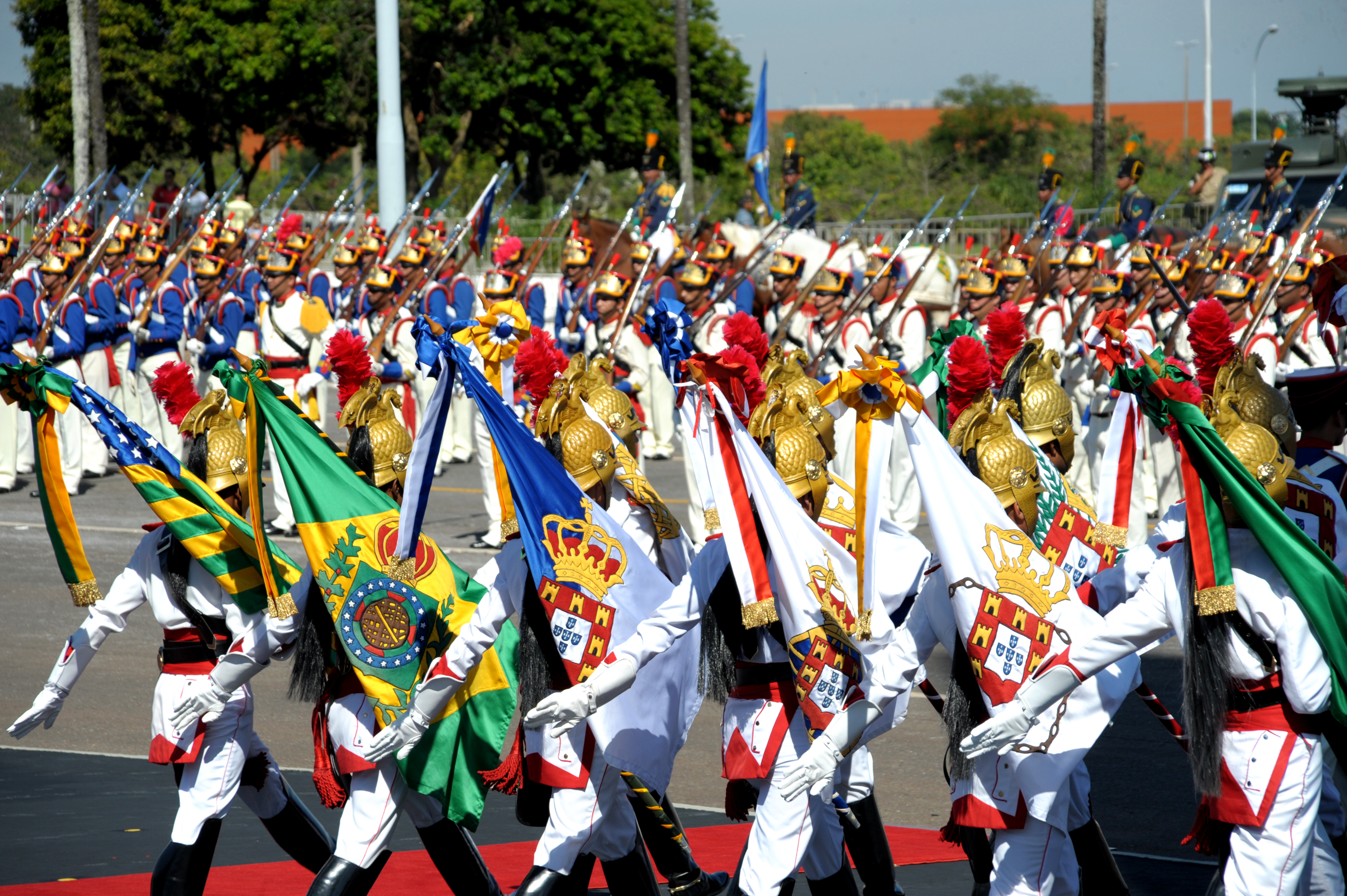
Soldiers carrying flags from different periods of Brazilian history

The Brazilian Army originates from the defense forces of the Portuguese Empire in Colonial Brazil. A Brazilian national army was designated by law for the first time in the Brazilian Empire's 1824 constitution, but land forces had already been fighting under the Brazilian flag since the proclamation of Independence in 1822. Command of these forces, until then dispersed among the viceroys and captain-generals of the captaincies, was unified under the Secretariat of State for War Affairs (later the Ministry of War) in 1822.

Since 1994, the Brazilian Army has officially commemorated the First Battle of Guararapes, fought on 19 April 1648, as the moment in which the "seeds" of the institution were planted. There was still no "Brazilian nation" or Brazilian Army, however, and no current military organization in the country has institutional continuity with those that fought in 1648. Several current units, however, trace their history back to the colonial period, such as the Old Terço of Rio de Janeiro, from 1567, whose heir is the 1st Mechanized Infantry Battalion.

The highest authority in the army was the Adjutant General, whose body, the Adjutant General's Office, was created in 1857. The Adjutant General was always a military officer and served as an intermediary between the army and the Minister of War, whose position was a political one. When the office was abolished, the chiefs of the Army General Staff (Estado-Maior do Exército; EME), created in 1899, and the Ministers of War began to compete for primacy of command. The Ministry of War won the dispute. In 1967, it was renamed Ministry of the Army, which was later transformed into the current Army Command, subordinate to the Ministry of Defense, in 1999.

=== 19th century ===
==== First reign ====
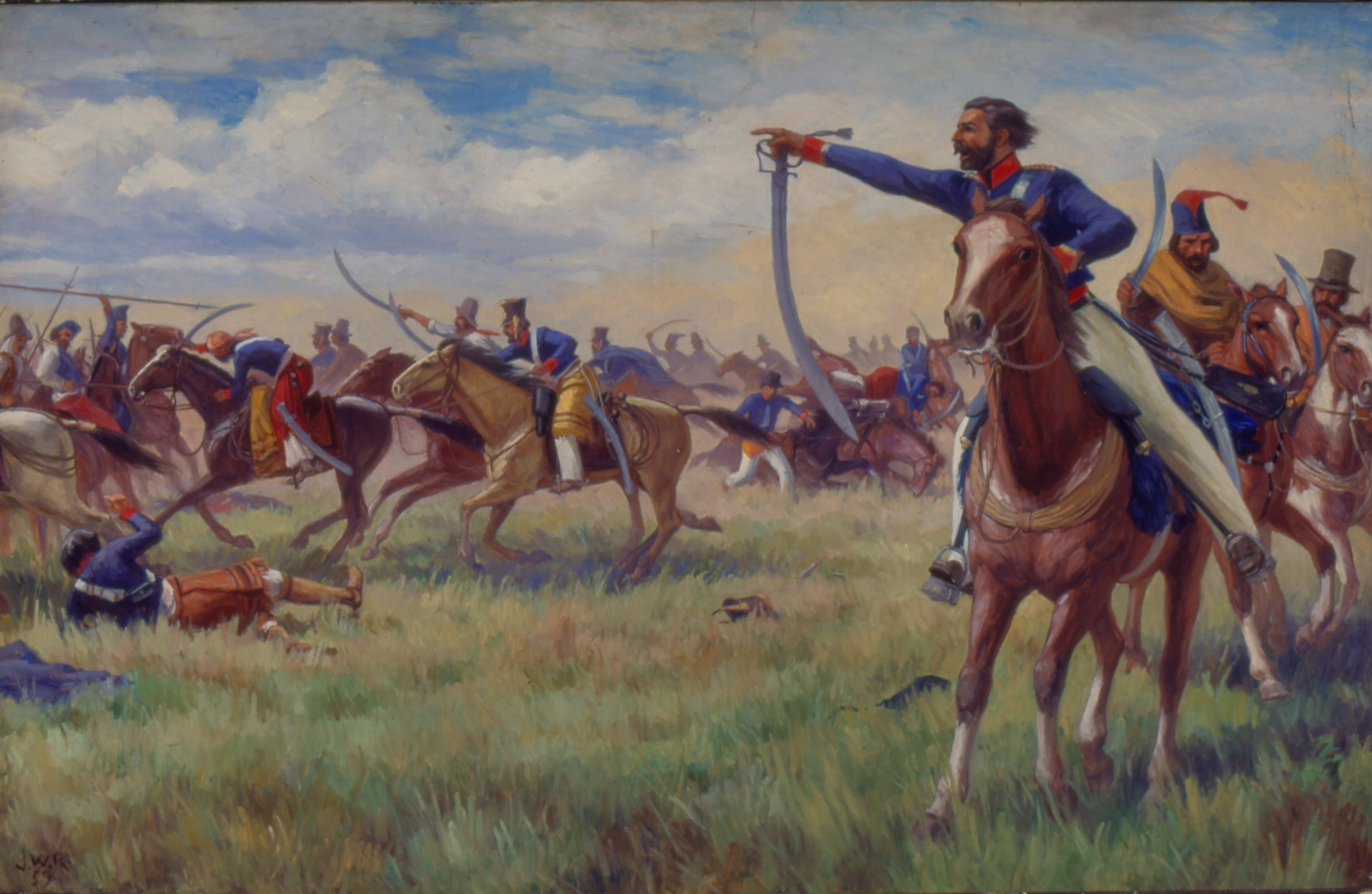
Brazilian cavalry at the Battle of Ituzaingó (1827), during the Cisplatine War. Painting by José Wasth Rodrigues

The Brazilian War of Independence divided the military forces present in what is now Brazilian territory: some joined the Brazilian cause and others remained loyal to Portugal. The Brazilian victory in the war did not break the continuity with the military organization and doctrine of the Portuguese Army, whose characteristics would be visible in the Brazilian institution until the beginning of the 20th century. Portuguese professionals, landowners, European mercenaries and ordenanças came together in a heterogeneous army.

The hierarchy had feudal aspects. Promotion criteria were poorly defined. Some officers progressed in their careers within the institution, but others, coming from the civilian elite and the aristocracy, moved between the ranks and politics. Officers did not serve far from their birthplaces, and it was only later that service rotation in the provinces emerged. Soldiers were generally obtained by impressment, (Note: Which is not to be conflated with conscription: "impressment describes coercive recruitment performed by police or press gangs. These agents most often targeted men without property, including vagrants and lawbreakers. Impressment did not rely on selecting men from an enrollment list, the act from which the term conscription derived its meaning" (Beattie, Peter M. (2001). The Tribute of Blood: army, honor, race and nation in Brazil, 1864–1945. Durham: Duke University Press. Author's note).) although there were volunteers, including fugitive slaves. Until 1830, and again in 1851–1852, foreign mercenaries served in the ranks, and even staged a revolt of their own. Military service, stigmatized, was known as the "blood tax".

In December 1824, the nominal force numbered 30 thousand men of the 1st line (paid troops) and 40 thousand of the 2nd line (unpaid militia and some paid police, veterans and irregular troops). Lack of training and politicized recruitment limited the military capacity of the 2nd line. The 1st line was organized into regiments, battalions and some smaller units called "corps". In December 1824, it comprised three grenadier battalions, 28 caçadores (light infantry) battalions, seven cavalry regiments, five horse artillery corps and 12 field artillery corps. Five brigades briefly existed in the Court (Rio de Janeiro), but throughout the century the army did not maintain large formations in peacetime. Provincial "commanders of arms" were subordinated to local governments, whose presidents were in turn appointed by the Emperor. This organization would undergo numerous changes. The structure of the Secretariat of State for War Affairs was small, and there was no general management body for the army in peacetime.

The army was initially an instrument of emperor Pedro I's authority, closing the Constituent Assembly in 1823 (the Night of Agony) and suppressing a separatist movement, the Confederation of the Equator. Its greatest difficulty was in the Cisplatine War, when it faced logistical obstacles and a high desertion rate.

==== Regency period ====
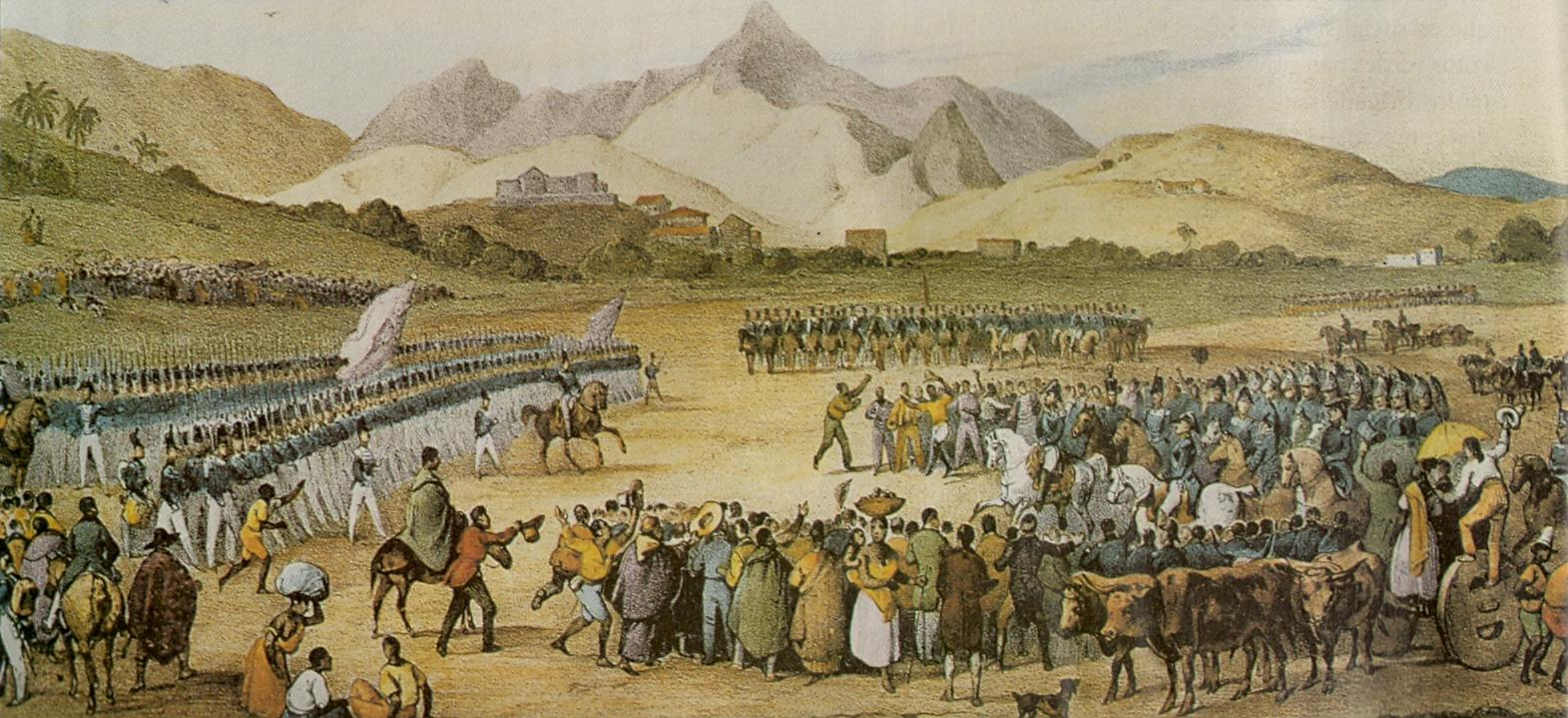
Brazilian Army troops in Rio de Janeiro, by Johann Moritz Rugendas, 1835

At the beginning of the regency period (1831–1840), the Liberal Party, predominant in politics, did not accept a large-scale professional military force, associating it, since previous years, with military losses in Cisplatina, mercenary revolts and the possibility of a coup. The 2nd line troops were replaced by the National Guard, which was considered civilian and was outside the jurisdiction of the Secretariat of War. The army did not have a monopoly on legitimate violence, which was shared with the National Guard and the justices of the peace, parish priests and police chiefs, who had authority over recruitment. Personnel were drastically reduced: in 1837, the entire force numbered just 6,320 men.

Faced with the numerous rebellions of the period, the political elite realized that territorial fragmentation of the country was the greatest danger and could not be controlled with the National Guard alone. Thus began the reconstruction of the army, which put down the Cabanagem, Balaiada, Sabinada and Ragamuffin uprisings. It is for this reason that the Duke of Caxias, the patron of the army, is known as the "Peacemaker". The army's official history emphasizes its role in ensuring national integrity.

==== Second reign ====
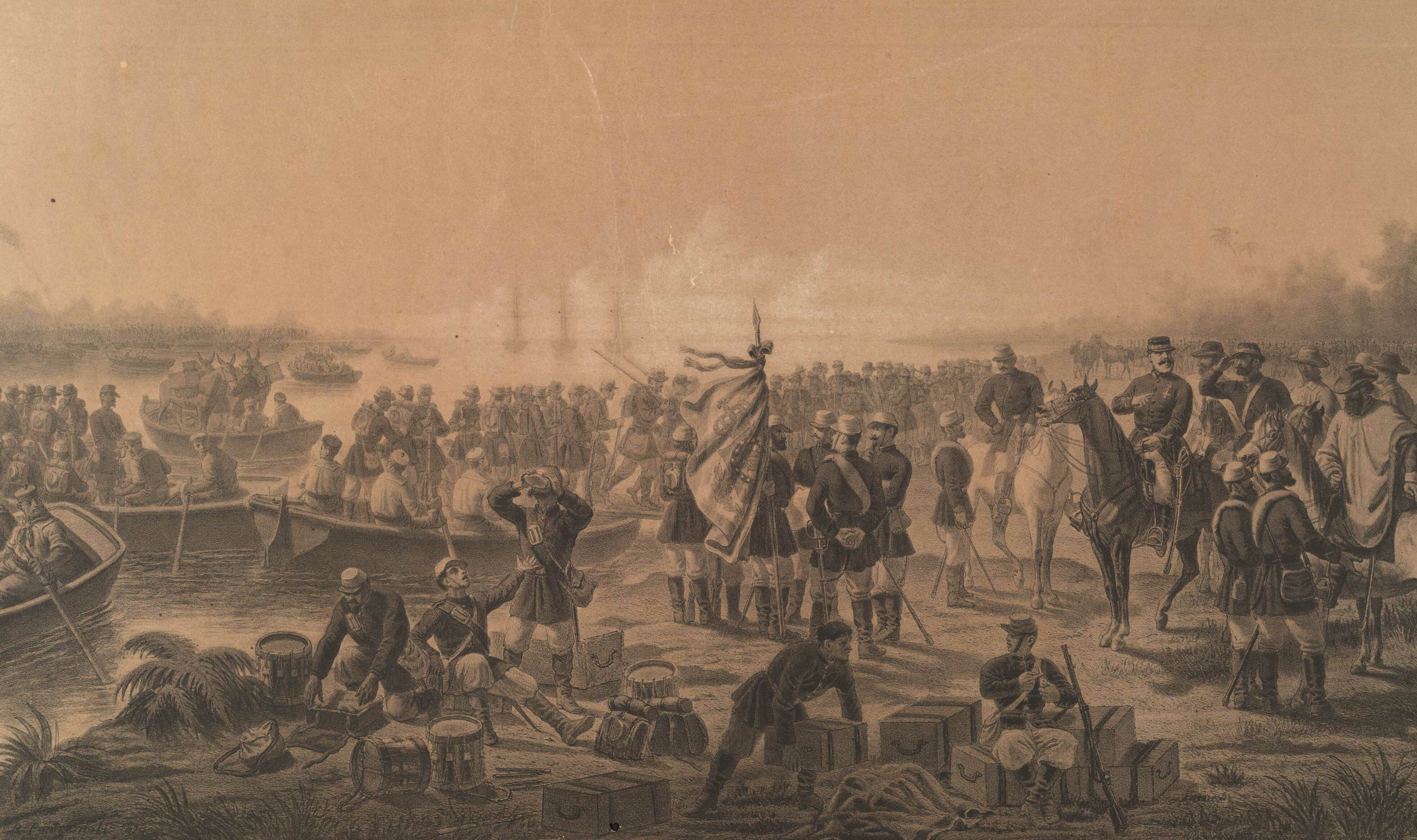
Brazilian troops landing in Paso de la Patria in 1866 during the Paraguayan War

By 1850 the political consensus was already in favor of the army. The force grew to 15–16 thousand men. By the 1851 organization, the army had eight rifle battalions, six caçadores battalions, four light cavalry regiments, one horse artillery regiment, and four foot artillery battalions. These would be the "mobile corps", intended for operations in any region. A series of small corps and companies were designated "garrison corps", responsible for the internal security of the provinces. Officers' careers were professionalized from 1850 onwards, with the adoption of formal criteria for advancement in the hierarchy and mandatory education in military courses. The sons of the civilian nobility, who preferred to serve in the National Guard, gradually disappeared. Except in Rio Grande do Sul, officers were recruited from social groups with lower incomes, especially children of military personnel.

With internal conflicts quelled, the Empire of Brazil used the army in external interventions in the Río de la Plata region. In 1851–1852, four army divisions, the National Guard and regional Argentine allies campaigned in the Platine War. The intervention was successful, but the risk of war remained in the region, and the government did not pay adequate attention to defense. When the Paraguayan War began in 1864, the Paraguayan Army had 60 thousand men, compared to 16 thousand in Brazil, whose war effort was marked by improvisation. Technologies of the Second Industrial Revolution, such as the rifle, the telegraph and the observation balloon, coexisted with Napoleonic tactics, such as the infantry square, the "cult of the bayonet", cavalry as a shock weapon and artillery fired at close range, with grapeshot. Lack of cartographic knowledge, good use of the terrain by the Paraguayans, logistical difficulties and epidemics delayed a decisive victory in the period before December 1868.

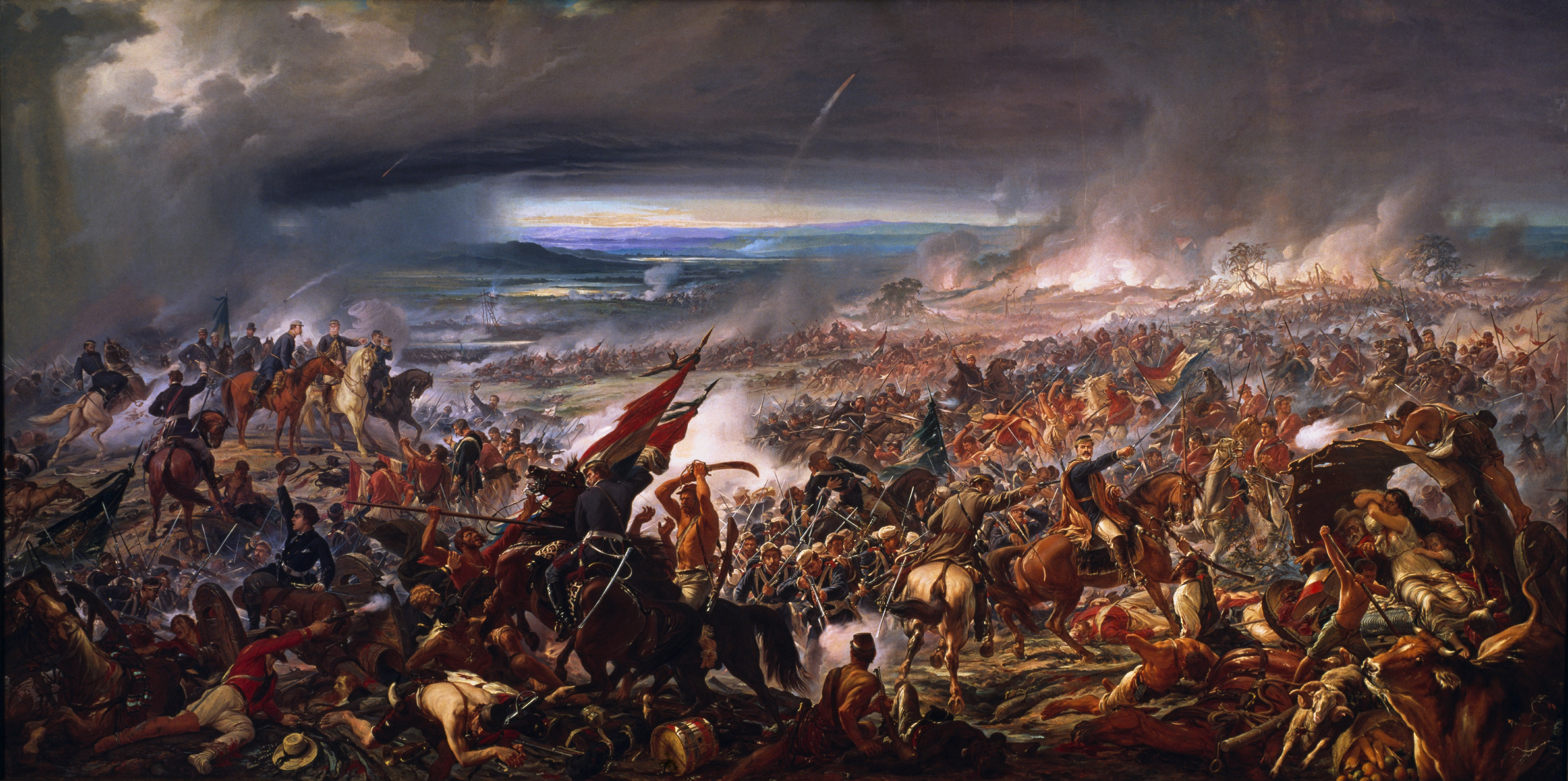
The Battle of Avay in 1868. Painting by Pedro Américo

The campaign was long and exhausting, on a much larger scale than the War of Independence. Ground forces were expanded to 135,000 soldiers, including 59,000 from the National Guard and 55,000 Homeland Volunteers. At least initially, there was great popular enthusiasm for military service. Three army corps were fielded. The army's official history recognizes Paraguay a second historical milestone after Guararapes. The institution became aware of its importance for the country, but it did not benefit after the victory in 1870: the budget was drastically reduced. Officers' nonconformity with political leaders grew. The participation of slaves in the struggle brought abolitionism to fore.

A new military service law attempted to reform recruitment in 1874, but was not enforced due to popular resistance by the so-called "list rippers". In the same year, officer education was completely separated from Civil Engineering and concentrated at the Military School of Praia Vermelha.

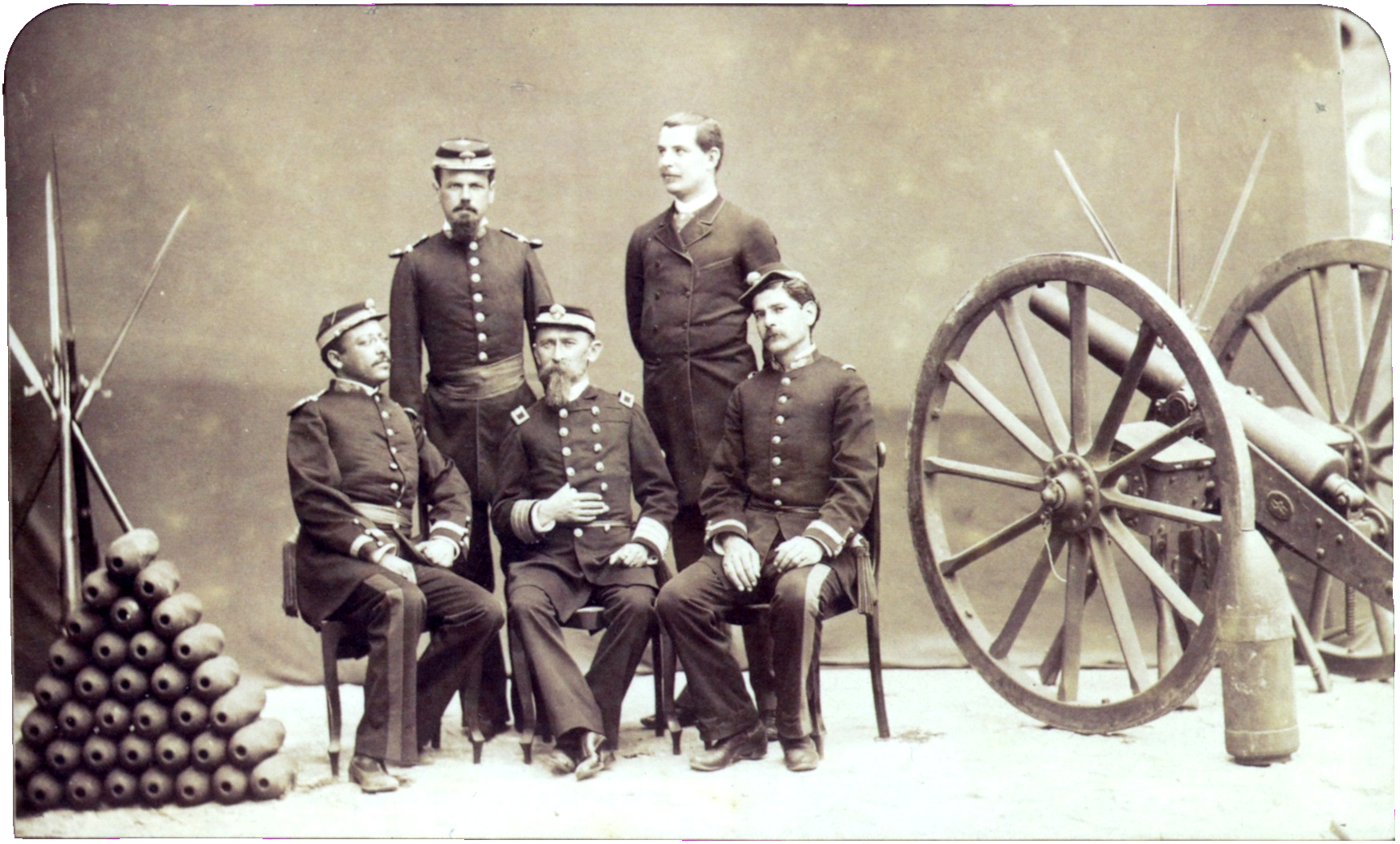
Brazilian officers in 1886

By the end of the Empire, the officers were divided between "scientists" and "tarimbeiros": the latter, veterans of the Paraguayan War, normally without a degree, and the former, trained at Praia Vermelha. The curriculum, unrelated to military disciplines, did not produce good troop commanders but rather intellectuals, engineers, bureaucrats and politicians, who competed with civilians with degrees. The 1888 organization defined 27 infantry units, ten cavalry units, four field artillery units, four position artillery units and two engineering units. The distinction between mobile and garrison corps disappeared. Units were very small, but would theoretically be expanded to a "war footing" when necessary, although there was no mobilization system.

With no apparent external danger, the authorities used the army in public order, capturing fugitive slaves and controlling elections, which outraged the new generation of officers. New positivist ideas were spreading. In the 1880s, a series of incidents with civilian authorities, known as the Military Question, strained the army's relationship with the monarchy. The army had already become a political force, capable of making a minister resign. In the end, young officers, old leaders and civilians proclaimed the republic in a military coup that deposed emperor Pedro II.

=== 20th century ===
==== First Brazilian Republic ====
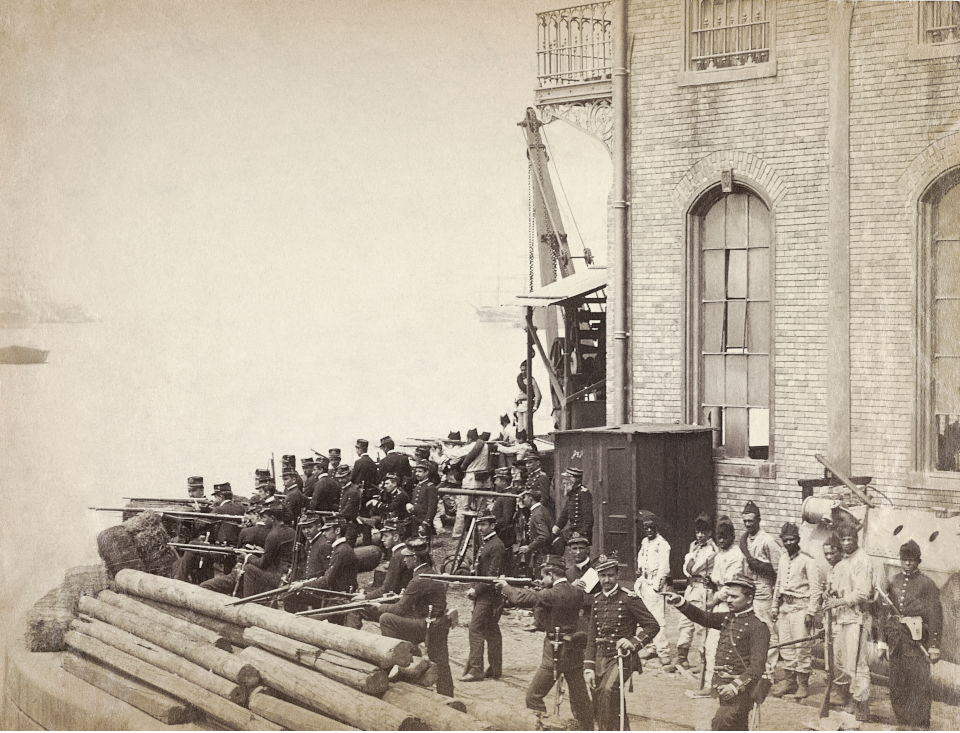
The army in the port area of Rio de Janeiro during the Navy Revolt

Until 1894, a period marked by the Federalist Revolution and the Navy Revolts, the new republican regime began under the tutelage of the army (the so-called Republic of the Sword). The military were not united and lost power to the civilian oligarchies, which were alienated from the officer class and transformed the Public Forces of the most powerful states into "small armies", a major obstacle to the expansion of the Armed Forces' power. The period was one of struggle to assert its relevance. In this context, the federal army guaranteed central power against regionalist tendencies.

By the 1890s, the army's operational capacity had fallen to a level sometimes inferior to the insurgents it faced. This and foreign policy fears sparked a military reform movement. The First World War (1914–1918) favored reformism, although direct Brazilian participation in land operations was limited to a mission of 26 officers to the French Army. Seeking a successful army as a reference, groups of officers (known as the "Young Turks") were sent to intern in the Imperial German Army in 1906–1912, and a French Military Mission was hired to advise on the reorganization of the Brazilian Army from 1920 to 1940. Strategic planning had the Argentine Army as its hypothetical enemy, at the time more modern and supported by a railway network that was denser than the Brazilian one. Armament also had to be imported, as the arms industry was very limited.

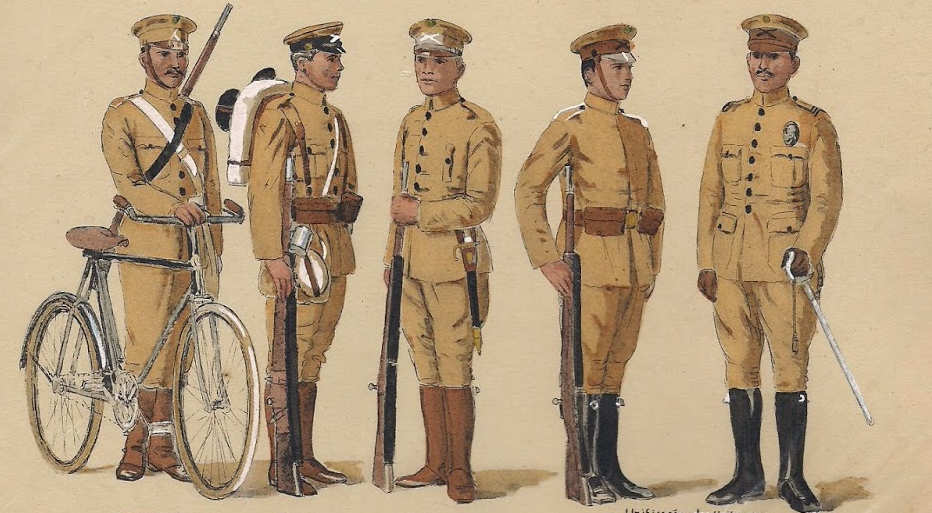
Light infantry uniforms in 1920

By 1919, the training of officers at the Military School of Realengo was already very different from Praia Vermelha: a curriculum dominated by professional subjects, field exercises and strict discipline, training officers with a strong sense of distinction from civilians. The introduction of compulsory military service through the Sortition Law, in 1916 allowed the abolition of the National Guard two years later, changed the army's relationship with society, made recruitment more judicious and allowed a gradual and continuous expansion of personnel. In the long term, this strengthened central power at the expense of regional oligarchies. Military Aviation was introduced and remained in the army until 1941, when it was absorbed by the newly created Brazilian Air Force.

The organization of these forces in peacetime was rudimentary until 1908, when commanders began to build a modern order of battle with regiments, brigades and divisions. In 1921 there were five infantry divisions, three cavalry divisions, a mixed brigade and independent units. The actual organization differed greatly from the formal one, with many incomplete regiments. Throughout the century, each new organization was somewhat fictional. The force was estimated at 37 thousand men in 1919.

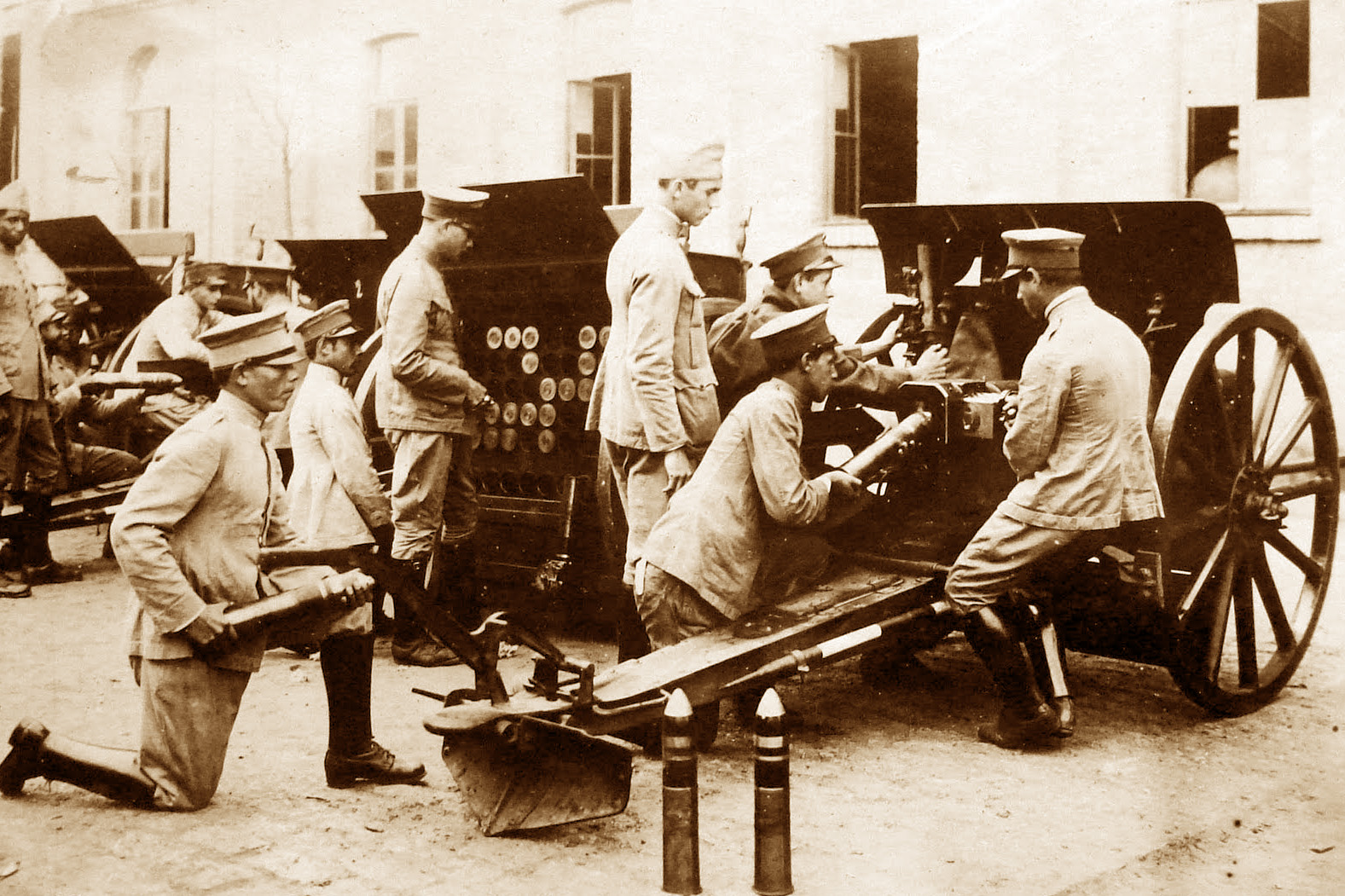
Garrison of a 75mm Krupp artillery piece, 1924

The operational history of the period has two major conflicts arising from social issues in the interior of the country: the War of Canudos (1897) and the Contestado War (1912–1916). In Canudos the force faced peasants without military training, but the terrain was adverse and well used by the opponent. The war concluded with the settlement of Belo Monte, in the interior of Bahia, burnt and littered by the bodies of thousands of inhabitants. The army suffered immense casualties. In the 1920s the army had difficulty suppressing a mobile enemy, the Prestes Column, as its French-influenced doctrine was for a conflict in the style of the Western Front of the First World War. On the other hand, the rebels were unable to threaten Rio de Janeiro. In 1924 there was an experience of urban combat and the bombing of São Paulo by army artillery.

Military revolts and interventions in politics marked the period, such as the proclamation of the republic itself, the Manifesto of the Thirteen Generals, Hermism/Salvation Policy, the Sergeants' Revolt of 1915, tenentism and the Revolution of 1930, which ended the First Republic. Most of the revolts involved the lower ranks and did not represent the army as a whole, damaging the hierarchy. The "Pacifying Movement", a military coup that made the 1930 Revolution triumph, differed in that it was planned by high levels of the army and navy. This was made possible by organizational changes, such as the development of the Army General Staff.

==== Vargas Era ====
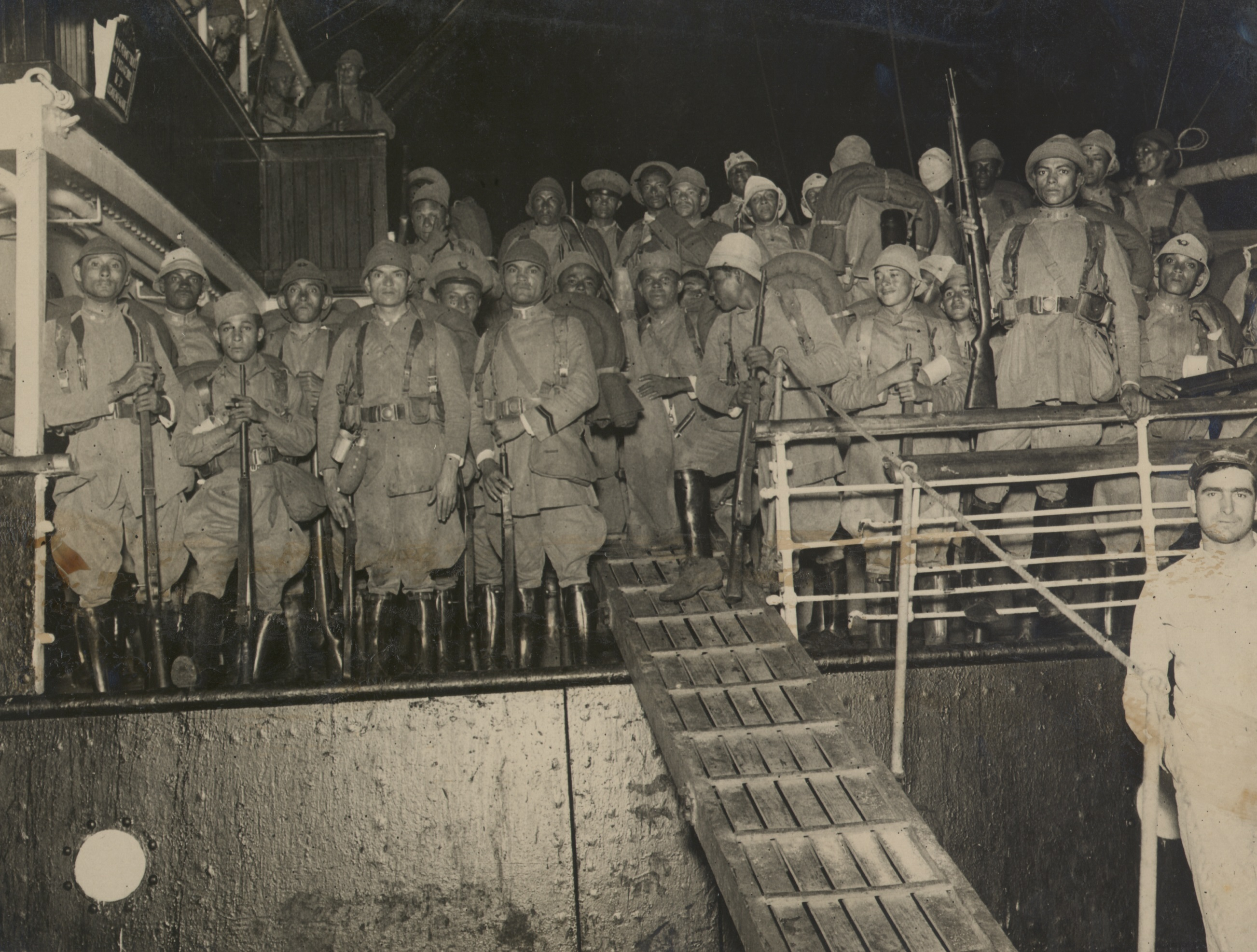
Transport of the 28th Battalion of Caçadores, from Sergipe, to fight in the Constitutionalist Revolution

Getúlio Vargas' first period in power (1930–1945) was one of great modernization and expansion for the Brazilian Army, which was introduced to the center of political power. The military received investments and positions in the administration. But the army was deeply divided. Revolts by sergeants and corporals threatened the hierarchy, to the point of overthrowing the government of Piauí in 1931, and the officers also rebelled. A large part of the São Paulo garrison joined the Constitutionalist Revolution of 1932, which was defeated due to the loyalty of the rest of the Armed Forces and state governments to Vargas. Army units rose up in the Communist Uprising of 1935, which was quickly put down. In 1938 the army also participated in the repression of the Integralist Uprising.

To homogenize the institution, the government and army leaders carried out several purges of the officer ranks. Revolts by young officers became less and less likely for organizational and technical reasons. General Góis Monteiro, considered the "first great ideologue" of the institution, wrote about the need for the "army's politics", not "politics in the army". The military aligned with the authoritarian and developmentalist ideals of the Estado Novo dictatorship, established by Vargas with a coup in 1937. The army served as the strong arm of a centralized State, and the Public Forces were placed under the control of the Ministry of War, putting an end to the phenomenon of "state armies". Military engineers participated in the development of the steel and oil industries in the country. The concept of security, for the army, had been expanded, encompassing planning, energy, transport and industrialization.

According to EME studies on the 1932 Constitutionalist Revolution, the army had evolved in its doctrine and organization, but was still unprepared to face an external aggressor, as evidenced by the deficiency in the ammunition industry. (Note: Nunes, Debate teórico e inferências a partir do caso da Doutrina Delta (2023), p. 65. "Thus, on some topics, the reports of the War Ministers of the 1930s and 1940s differed little from the devastating portrait of the army's situation in 1918, drawn up by the then minister Pandiá Calógeras: failure of the military enlistment and lottery system, little or no military base industry, empty warehouses, scarce and deficient ammunition, mediocre troop instruction, officers more concerned with bureaucracy than missions and professional development". Ferraz, Francisco César Alves (2021). "O Serviço militar brasileiro na hora da verdade: a preparação para o combate em tempos de paz e a participação brasileira na Campanha da Itália". Fuerzas Armadas, fronteras y territorios en Sudamérica en el siglo XX: Perspectivas y experiencias desde Argentina y Brasil. La Plata: UNLP. pp. 146-147.) The Chaco War (1932– 1935) between Bolivia and Paraguay helped the army to continue expanding its numbers, which exceeded 60 thousand men. Anti-aircraft artillery and mobile coastal artillery were implemented. Later on, Brazil's entry into the Second World War in 1942 gave the army its "only experience [...] in a conventional war along the lines of a total war". Fighting alongside the Allies, Brazil received weapons (via Lend-Lease) and sent officers to study in the United States. The army's strength grew from around 80,000 men to 200,000 in 1944, organized into eight infantry divisions, three cavalry divisions and a mixed brigade.

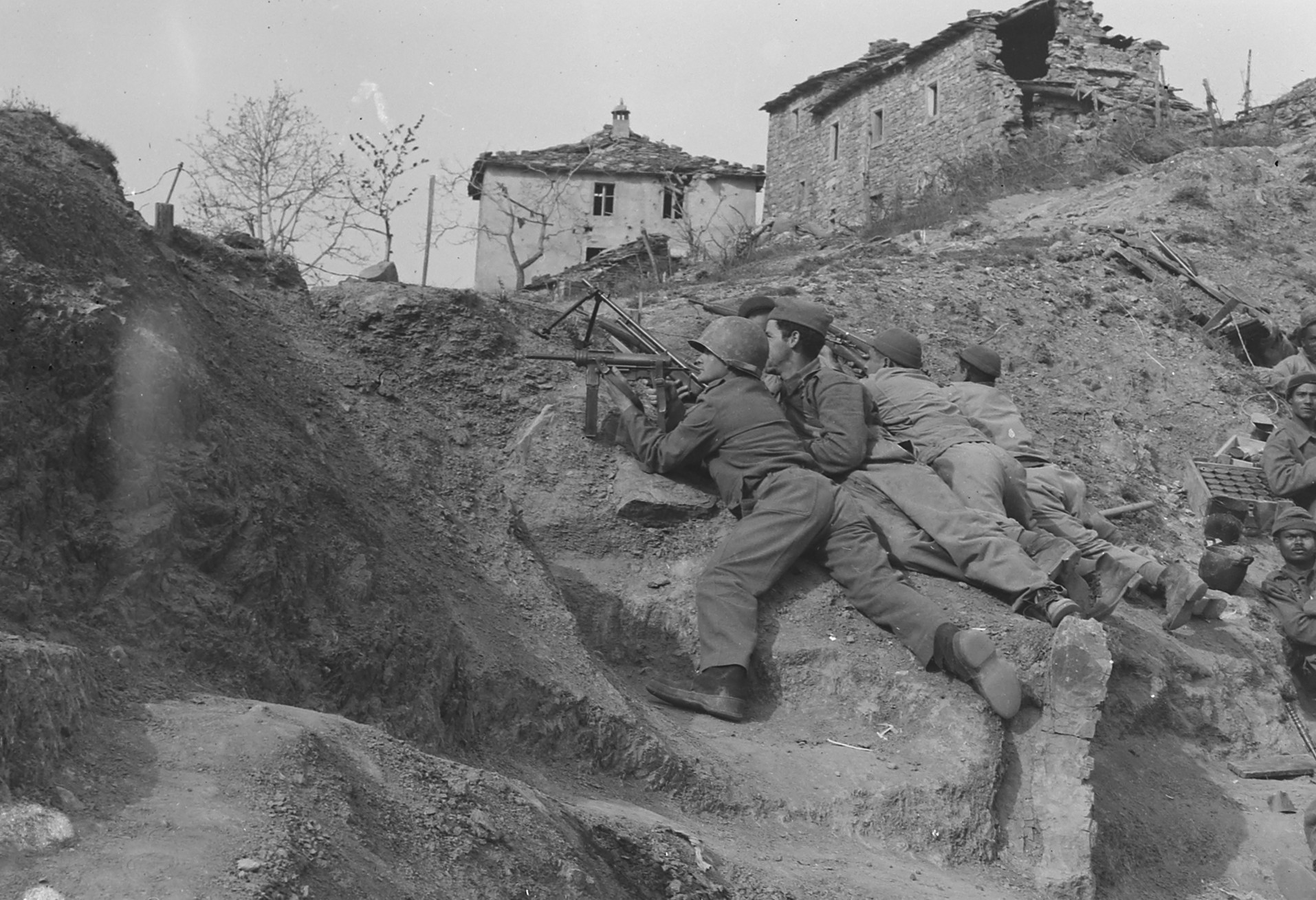
Brazilian expeditionaries at the Battle of Montese in 1945

The army's participation consisted of reinforcing the northeastern salient (Note: The northeastern salient would be the likely bridgehead of a hypothetical Axis invasion of South America, and the Brazilian Army expanded its strength there from 5 to 60 thousand men (Bento, Cláudio Moreira (1991). "Participação das Forças Armadas e da Marinha Mercante do Brasil na Segunda Guerra Mundial (1942-1945)". Revista do Instituto Histórico e Geográfico Brasileiro (172).). Before Brazil entered the war, the United States Armed Forces thought about invading the region themselves (Plan Rubber), and did not expect strong resistance from the Brazilian Army in their biggest objective, Natal (Gannon, Michael; Oliveira, José Maria do Amaral (2000). "Quosque tandem...? Quo jure? A invasão do Brasil". Revista Marítima Brasileira. 120 (10–12).) and sending the Brazilian Expeditionary Force (FEB) to the Italian Campaign. The Brazilian government promised three infantry divisions for the war effort, but due to mobilization difficulties, it was only possible to send the 1st Expeditionary Infantry Division (1st DIE), subordinate to the IV Corps of the United States Army. The Battle of Monte Castello, which it fought in 1944–1945, was not the most important of the IV Corps, but it stood out within the experience of the FEB, which overcame its inexperience and won after several demoralizing defeats in the offensive. Tactics changed from French to American: from frontal attacks to flanking enemy positions and attacking in multiple directions. The FEB was demobilized even before returning to Brazil, as it was considered a political threat. This did not prevent the ousting of Vargas by the Armed Forces in 1945, after which democracy was restored. The army had changed a lot, and in addition to its technical modernization, had become politically autonomous and convinced that it could form a well-trained elite.

==== Fourth Brazilian Republic ====
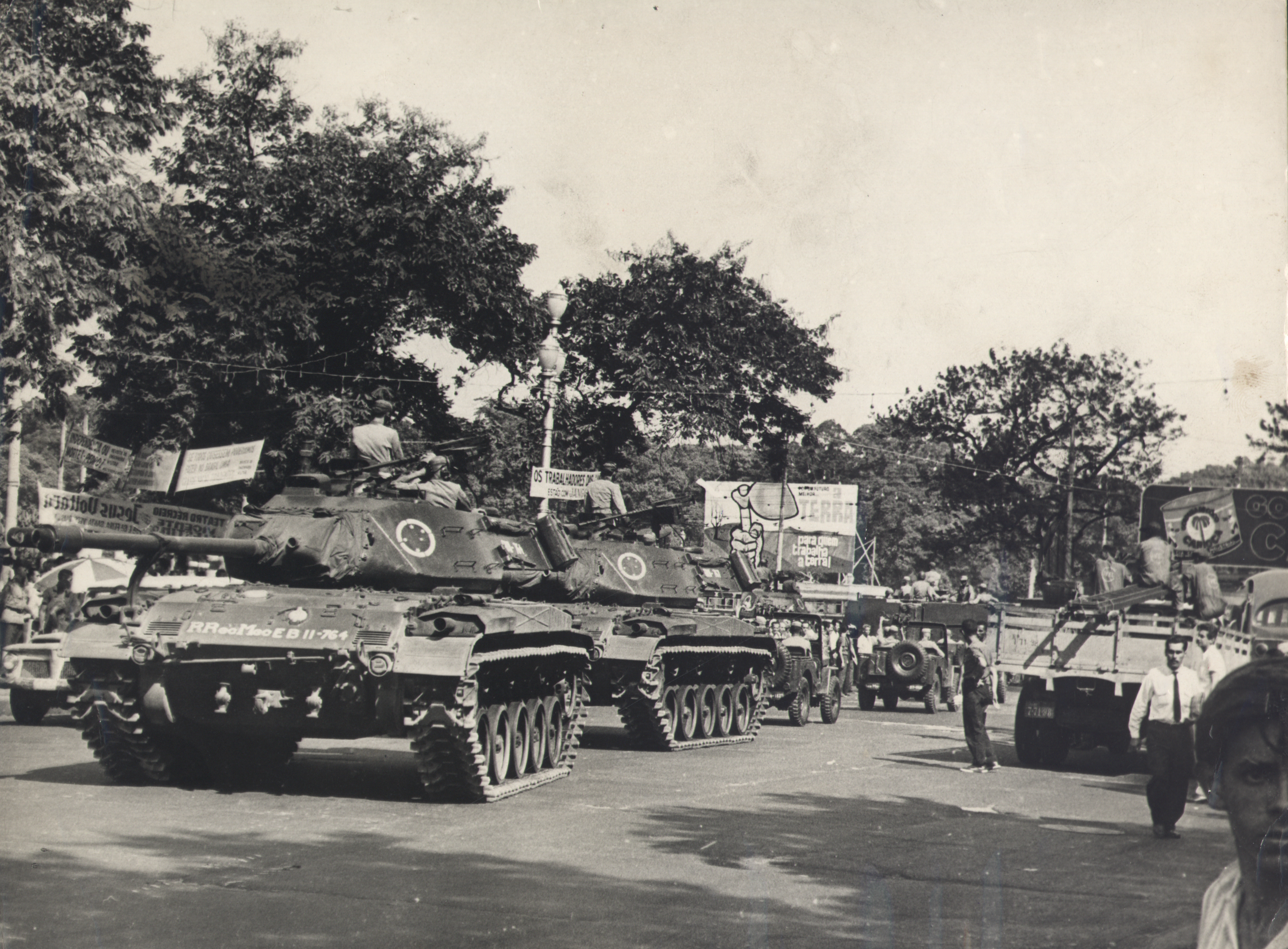
M41 Walker Bulldog light tanks in the Central Rally in 1964

The Brazilian Army adopted American doctrine, organization, manuals and methods after World War II, although the absorption was partial, as older materiel of European origin and French concepts remained. New equipment was obtained through the Brazil–United States Treaty. Since the war, motorized vehicles began to replace carts and mules. The use of armored vehicles, until then very limited, was consolidated. The training of sergeants was centralized and professionalized at the Escola de Sergentos das Armas (Combatant Sergeants' School). From the 1950s onwards, sergeant revolts disappeared. The movements of enlisted personnel in the rest of the Armed Forces had less repercussions on the army.

In 1960 the force comprised seven infantry divisions, four cavalry divisions, one armored division, the core of an airborne division, a mixed brigade and a School-Unit Group. These forces were grouped into four Military Zones in 1946, later called Armies in 1956, equivalent to the current Military Area Commands. The new structure was sophisticated, but the doctrine did not correspond to reality. Infantry divisions were supposed to have 15,000 men each, but averaged 5,500. Officials feared Brazil's military fragility. On the other hand, the relative power of neighboring countries was declining. The hypothesis of war against Argentina lost relevance and coexisted with concerns of the Cold War: nuclear war, revolutionary war and peace operations, of which the first with Brazilian participation was the Suez battalion (1957–1967).

The institution's political participation was continuous. In 1955, Minister of War Henrique Teixeira Lott carried out a "preventative coup", opposing the Navy and Air Force, to ensure the inauguration of president Juscelino Kubitschek. In 1961, the three military ministers (army, navy and air force) tried to veto the inauguration of João Goulart as president, but a split in the army allowed the victory of the inauguration cause. Finally, the 1964 coup d'état began with the main commands of the army in loyalist hands, but officers defected en masse and the president was removed without a fight. Military personnel aligned with the deposed government were purged, including 22.5% of the generals serving in 1964. The ideological basis of Goulart's opponents was anti-communism, developed since 1935, and the doctrine of revolutionary war.

==== Military dictatorship ====
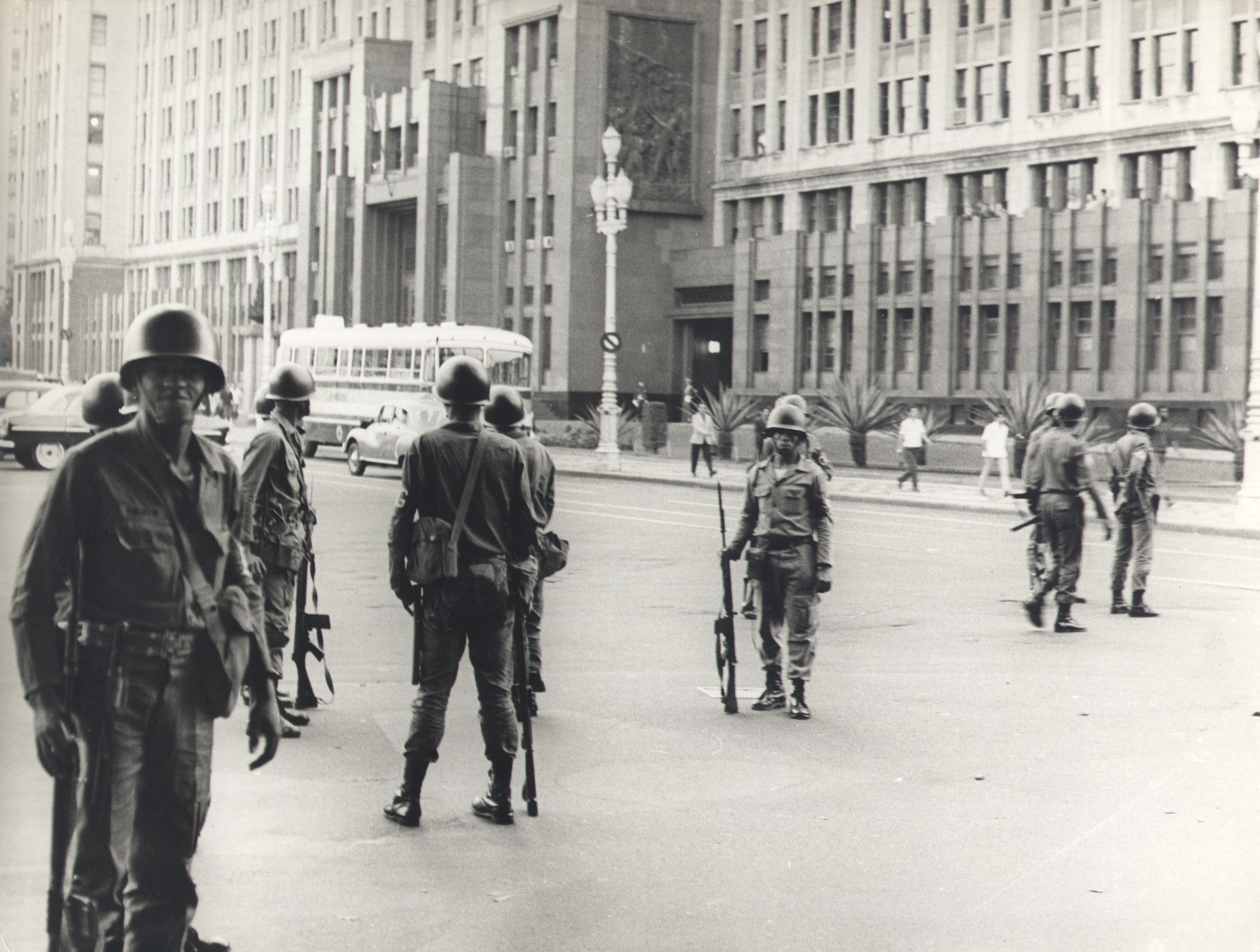
Soldiers in front of the Duke of Caxias Palace, former Army HQ, during demonstrations against the dictatorship in 1968

In the subsequent military dictatorship (1964–1985) the center of political power was occupied by generals, although the institutions formally remained those of a liberal democracy. Generals disputed among themselves and were challenged by junior officers. Political repression activities were centralized in the army, whose Internal Defense Operations Centers (Centros de Operações de Defesa Interna; CODI) coordinated the Armed Forces and the police. Military personnel were responsible for illegal detentions, torture, executions, forced disappearances and concealment of corpses, and the army played a fundamental role in the genocide of the Waimiri-Atroari indigenous people.

The armed struggle against the dictatorship was faced mainly by high-ranking intelligence bodies, such as the CODI and the Army Information Center (Centro de Informações do Exército; CIEx). Large-scale use of conventional troops for counterinsurgency occurred rarely and was ineffective. The Araguaia Guerrilla (1972–1975), the most extensive rural insurgency of the period, could only be defeated by the principle of "fighting guerrilla with guerrilla": extensive intelligence work, infiltrated plainclothes patrols and the participation of the Special Forces Company.

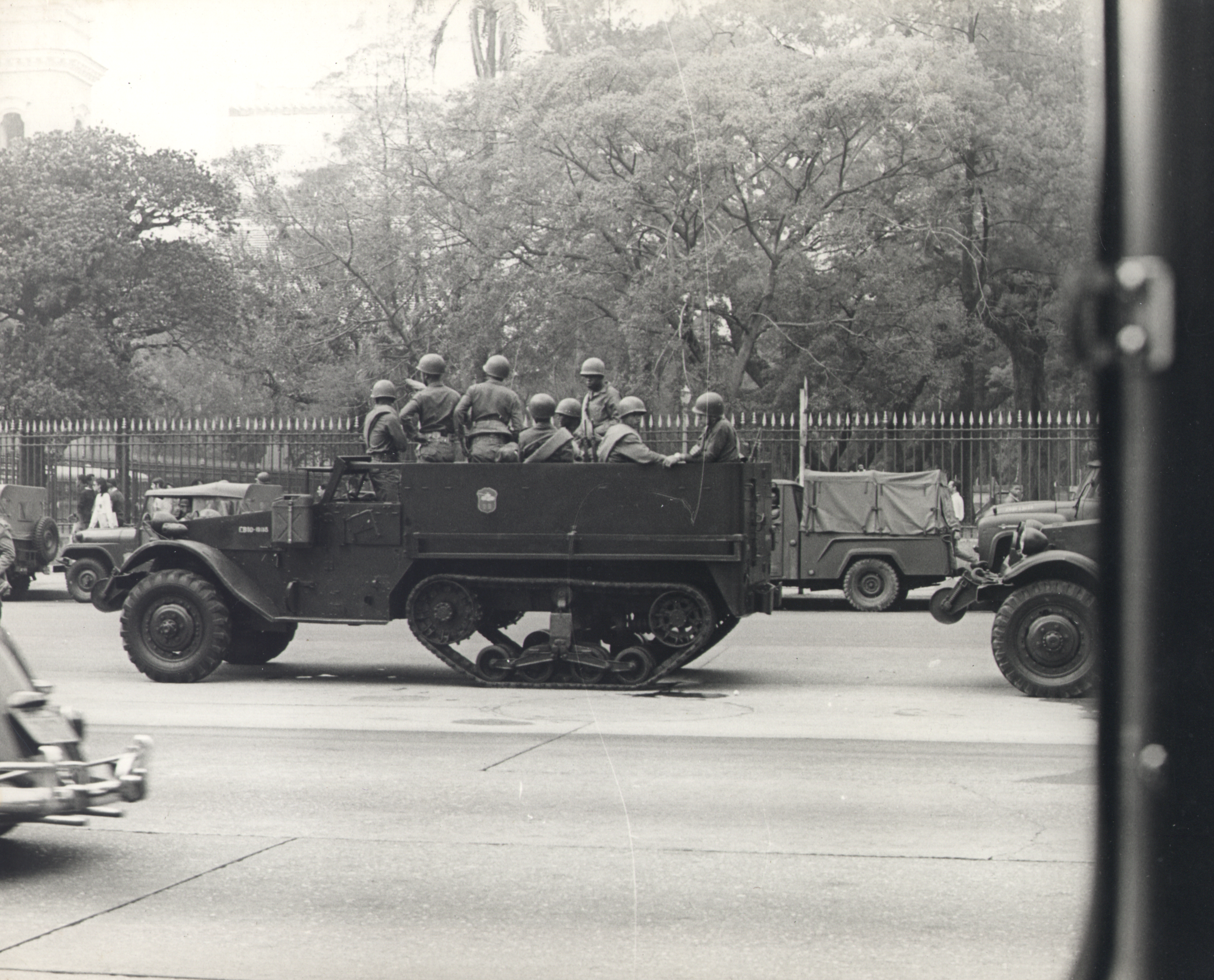
Half-track of the Armored Division in 1968

The "economic miracle" allowed the re-equipment of the army in the period 1969–1974, with a focus on conventional warfare. Counterinsurgency did not make the military give up external defense, in part as a way of demonstrating the state's prestige. There were two hypotheses of war: a "revolutionary war in South America" and a war between the Western and Communist blocs, with Brazil contributing an expeditionary army corps to the Western bloc. Equipment inventories were rapidly nationalized thanks to the development of companies in the national arms industry, such as Engesa. Rifles, machine guns, artillery and armor were replaced by 1980.

After a century of emulating foreign armies, the Brazilian Army sought a doctrine more suited to local needs. The order of battle was reorganized, suppressing infantry and artillery regiments and creating brigades, which became the main large maneuver units, a system that still remains in the 21st century. Total strength was at 170 thousand in 1970. In 1980 the army fielded 13 ordinary infantry, one airborne, two jungle infantry, three armored infantry, one armored cavalry and four mechanized cavalry brigades. But not all goals were met, and there remained a technological delay in relation to the Argentine Army. (Note: "In April 1981, following an invitation from the commander of the Argentine Army, general Walter Pires, then Minister of the Brazilian Army, visited military installations in that country and found that the neighboring country, due to the arms race with Chile, had acquired the most modern military materiel, contrasting with the obsolescence of much of Brazilian equipment, especially in terms of artillery, armored equipment and electronic assets". As forças armadas no Brasil (1987), Espaço e Tempo, p. 8, cited in Siqueira, Júlio César Aguiar (2019). A evolução da estrutura organizacional do Exército Brasileiro entre 1970 e 2005 (PDF) (Thesis). Escola de Comando e Estado-Maior do Exército. Archived (PDF) from the original on 7 October 2022. p 38.)

==== Redemocratization and post-Cold War ====
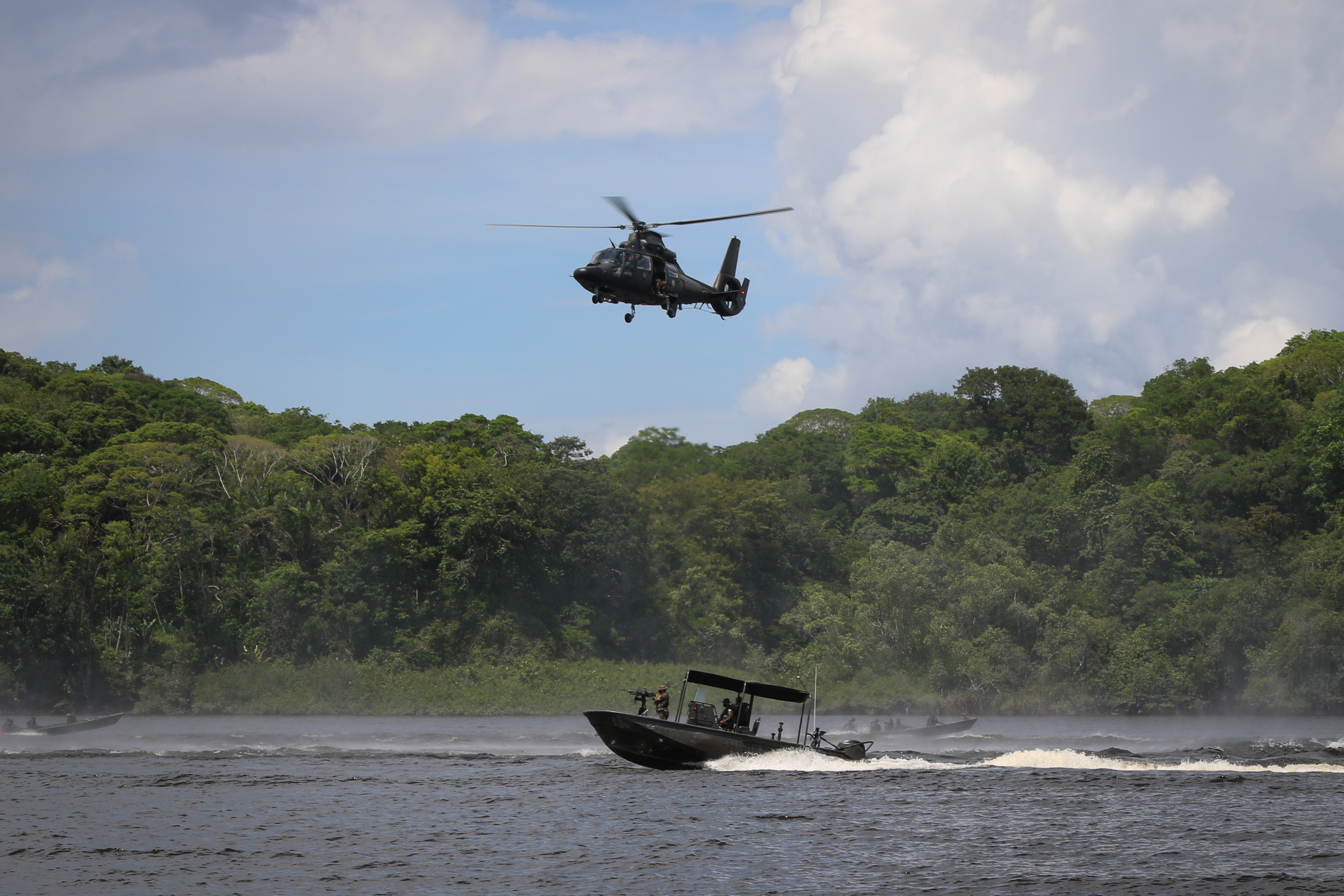
The new Army Aviation on the Amazon borders

Argentina's defeat in the Falklands War in 1982 shocked the Brazilian military. The United States did not support a South American country against an extracontinental power, and the Brazilian Armed Forces would clearly be out of date in a similar conflict. Basic equipment was lacking and operational capacity was very low. The EME began to study the hypothesis of a war with a country from the Western bloc, economically and militarily superior to Brazil, in the Amazon region, at the same time that it planned the "army of the future", devising the Força Terrestre 90 (FT 90), Força Terrestre 2000 and Força Terrestre do Século XXI programs.

After the end of the military dictatorship in 1985, the army distanced itself from political-ideological confrontation and began executing the FT 90 and its successors. By the end of the 1980s, the social and economic standards of officers had declined, and by the beginning of the following decade, the army's strategic priorities had become undefined. Traditional threats (communism and Argentina) were giving way to non-traditional ones. The United States Army once again became the "model to be followed" by winning the 1991 Gulf War, inspiring the Brazilian "Delta Doctrine". The Brazilian arms industry collapsed.

In 1991, the incursion of the Revolutionary Armed Forces of Colombia (FARC) into Brazilian territory and the subsequent Operation Traíra redoubled attention in the Amazon. Army officers viewed transnational crime, Colombian guerrillas, and environmental and indigenous issues as possible pretexts for foreign intervention in the region. At the same time, public authorities often use the army for operations to guarantee law and order in places such as Rio de Janeiro, as well as for subsidiary missions, which are, in a certain way, accommodated by the political class. Abroad, participation in international UN missions increased.

=== 21st century ===
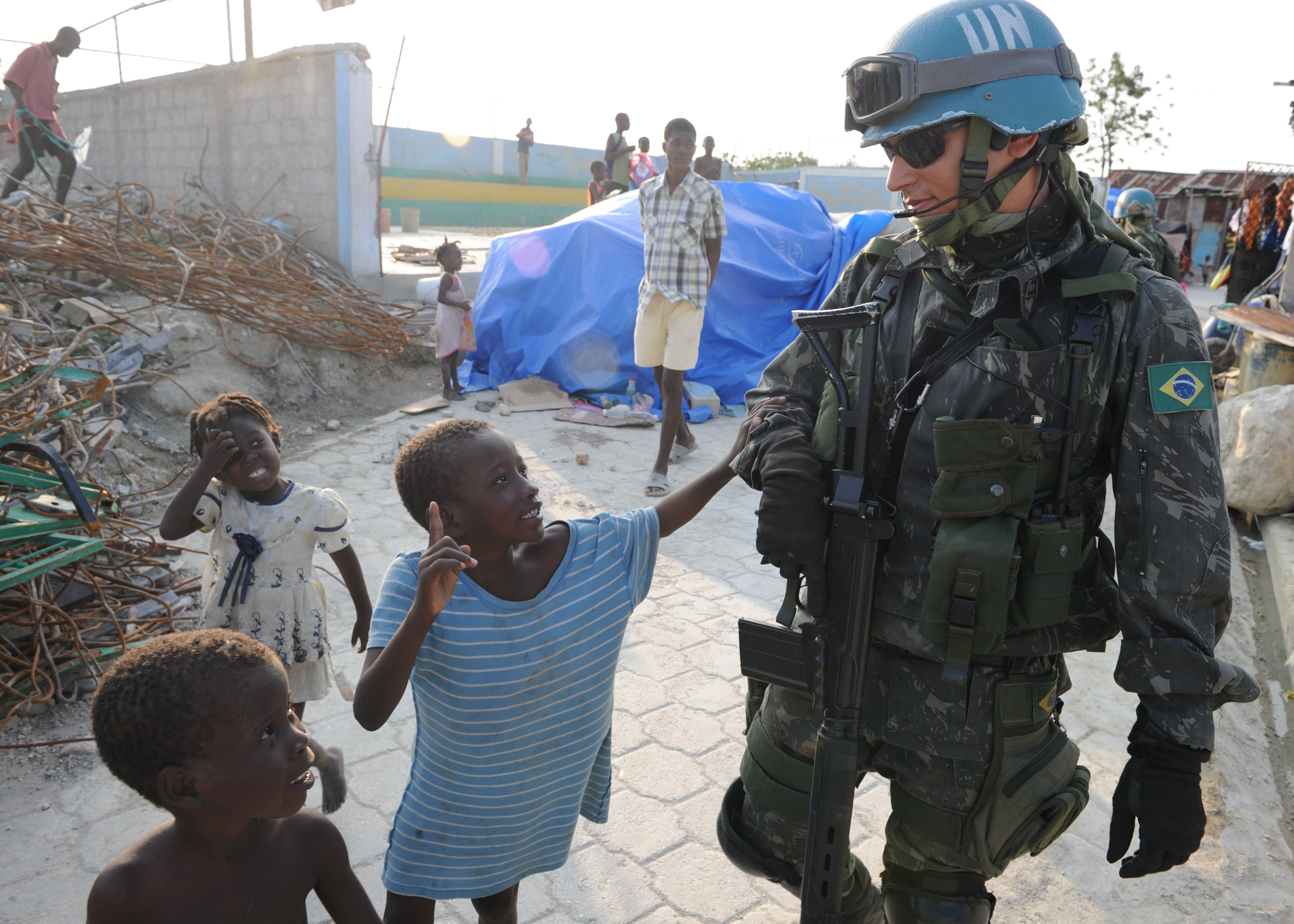
A Brazilian U.N. peacekeeper during a patrol in Cité Soleil, Haiti

Total personnel grew from 194,000 in 1985 to 238,000 in 2007, below the large quantitative expansion planned in the 1980s, due to budget restrictions. The army of 2007, despite not being much larger than that of 1985, was more specialized, with new technologies. Electronic warfare capabilities were acquired and the roster of rapid action forces was expanded with the new Army Aviation Brigade (1989), airmobile infantry (1995) and the expansion of special operations forces (2003).

The first Brazilian main battle tanks were acquired, the Leopard 1 and M60 models, and the structure of Brazilian armored brigades was made equivalent to their Argentine counterparts, despite good bilateral relations. An attempt was made to reduce dependence on compulsory military service, but the costs of professional soldiers limited the measures. The Amazon Military Command's two brigades of jungle infantry were reinforced by another three.

In 2012 some generals gave the press an overview of the army, describing its aging equipment and technological obsolescence. Since 2004, only 9 to 10% of the budget was available for funding and investments, with the remainder being spent on personnel. The guidelines for the Army Transformation Process had just been published, with ambitious goals for the year 2030, just like the planners of the 1980s, who had defined 2010 as the year in which the "army of the future" would exist. The drivers of the Transformation Process are strategic projects/programs, (Note: Originally "Strategic Projects" and later "Strategic Programs", grouped into the "Army Strategic Portfolio". See O Portfólio Estratégico do Exército, Revista Verde-Oliva, no. 237, 2017.) such as ASTROS 2020, for the expansion of missile and rocket artillery (Astros II) and the development of a cruise missile (AV-TM 300); Guarani armored vehicles, with a new family of wheeled armor; Anti-Air Defense, with the renewal of low-altitude anti-aircraft artillery and acquisition of medium-altitude artillery; and the Integrated Border Monitoring System, Cyber Defense and others.

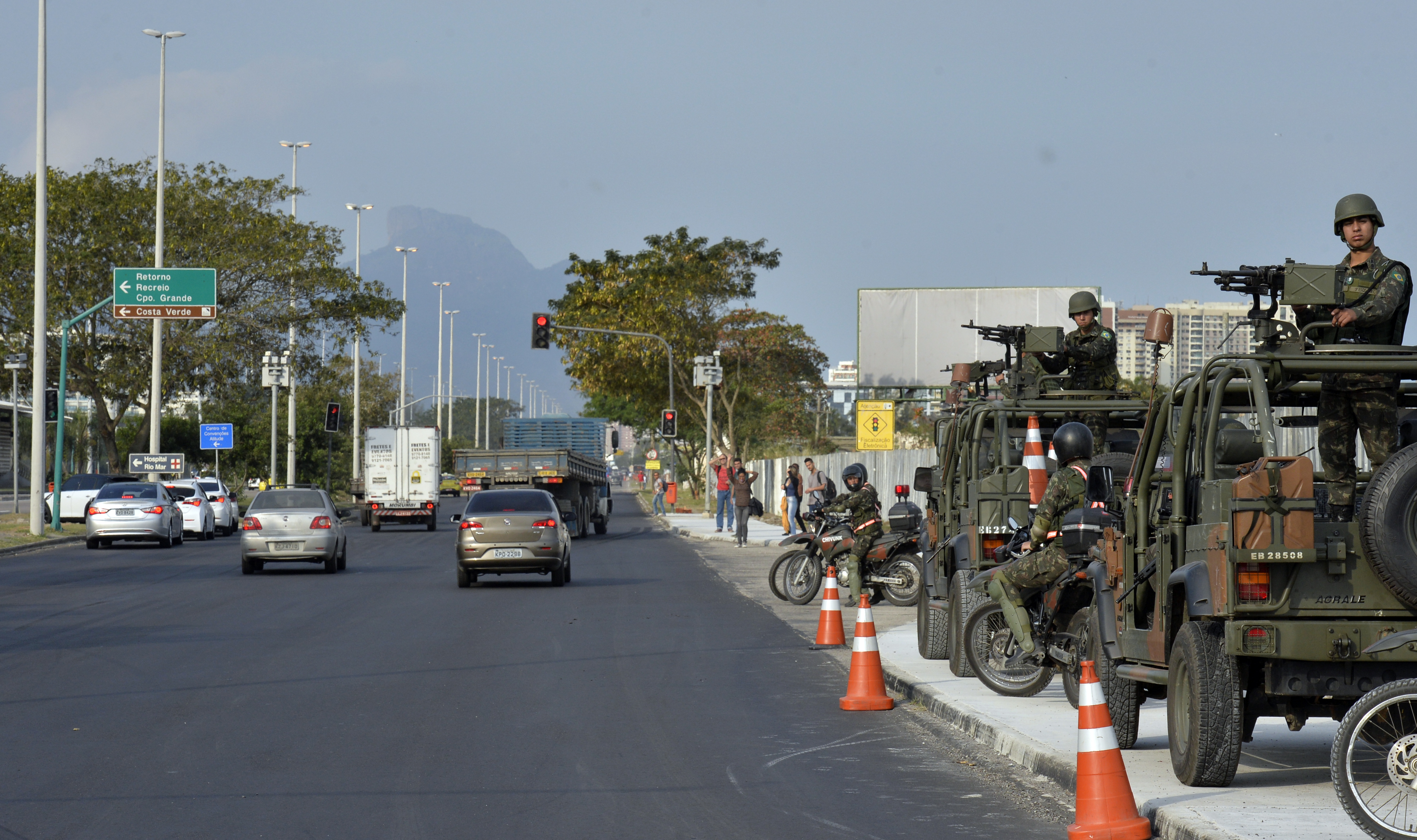
The army in the security of the 2016 Olympics in Rio de Janeiro

A notable peacekeeping operation during this period was the United Nations Stabilization Mission in Haiti (MINUSTAH) (2007–2017). Most of the Brazilian battalion commanders in Haiti achieved generalship.

The occupation of Complexo do Alemão in 2010 was the largest law and order operation since the promulgation of the 1988 Constitution, and was considered more difficult than Haiti. When confronting organized crime in Rio de Janeiro's favelas, the military had to change tactics and equipment. They recognize the difficulty of police work, in which they are not specialized and there is a risk of collateral damage. There were protests by local residents against abuses of authority, torture and excessive shooting and use of tear gas. In the federal intervention in Rio de Janeiro in 2018, an army general held the position of Secretary of Security in Rio de Janeiro, and other generals held roles in that secretariat and in the federal intervention office.

Strategic projects suffered from contingencies and cuts in military spending resulting from the economic crisis of the mid-2010s, and by 2019 their deadlines were already being extended, some until 2040. When the Guyana-Venezuela crisis began in 2023, the army reinforced Roraima, but still did not have cruise missiles, medium-altitude anti-aircraft defense or Centauro II tank destroyers available.

== Personnel ==
Military personnel may be on active or reserve status. If active, they may be career military personnel (with guaranteed or presumed lifetime status) or temporary personnel. The number established by decree for the army in 2023 was 212,217 active military personnel, of which 149 were generals, 29,220 other officers, 46,773 warrant officers and sergeants and 136,005 corporals and privates. Out of 214 thousand in 2023, the International Institute for Strategic Studies (IISS) quantified 112 thousand conscripts. There are much lower estimates of the proportion of conscripts (30%). In addition to active duty personnel, the IISS estimated the reserve at 1,340,000 military personnel in 2023, but did not distinguish between the three branches; Frank McCann estimated over a million Army reservists in 2017. The Brazilian Army is historically one of the largest in the region. (Note: Dullius, Gastos militares na América do Sul (2008), p. 12, noting, however, that the Colombian Army was already larger than the Brazilian one. In 2023, however, it had a total personnel of 185,900 (IISS, The Military Balance (2023), p. 390), smaller than the Brazilian one.)

=== Ranks and uniforms ===
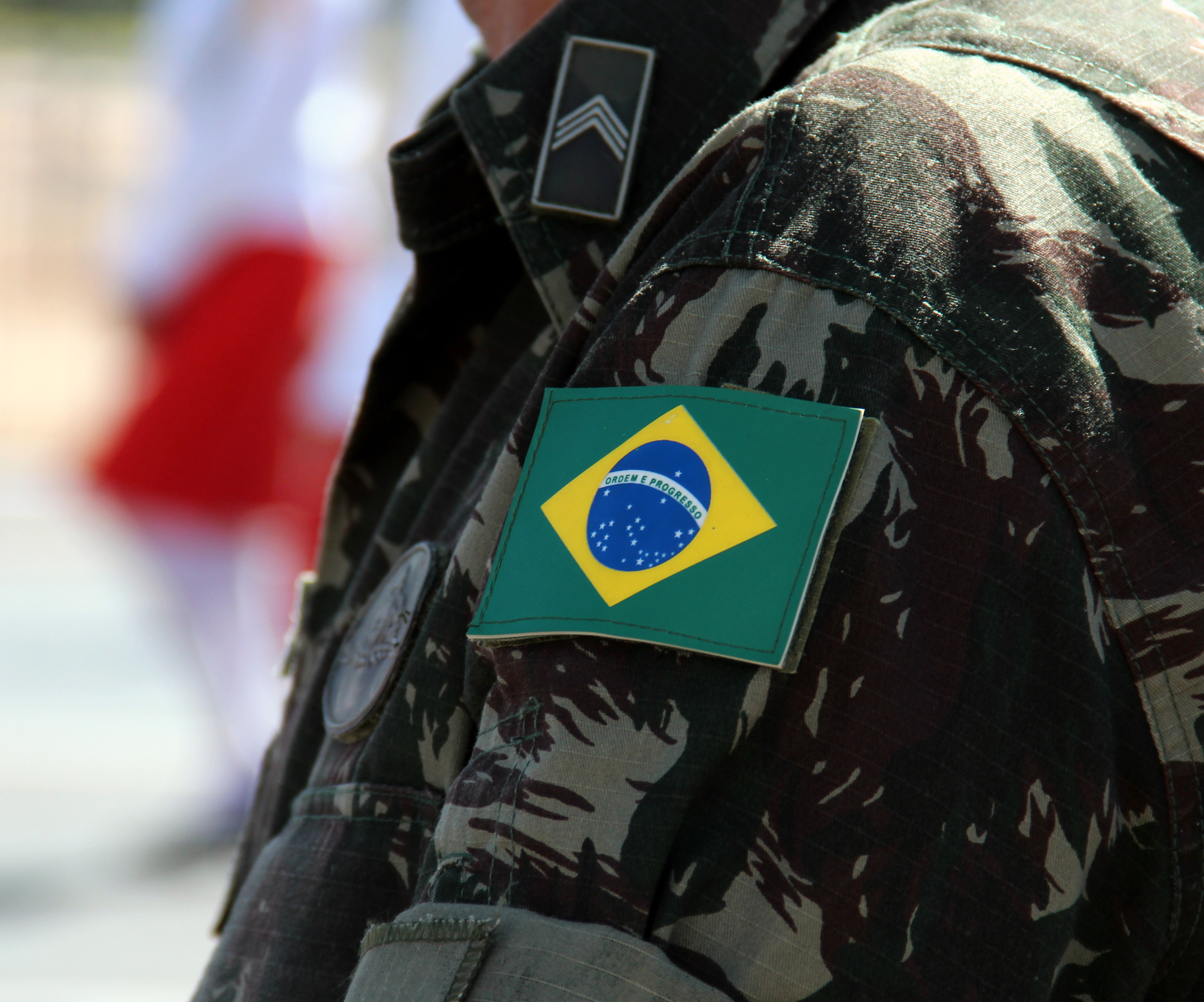
Standard army camouflage uniform, with a third sergeant's collar chevron

Hierarchy and discipline are formally defined as the basis of the organization of the Armed Forces. In the army the hierarchy comprises 19 levels, called "postos" on the upper levels (officers), and "graduações" on the lower ones (enlisted personnel). Postos and graduações are grouped into social coexistence circles: from highest to lowest, they are the circles of general officers, (Note: Marshal, army general, divisional general and brigadier general, respectively identified by five, four, three and two stars (Hudson, Brazil: a country study (1998), p. 386).) senior officers, (Note: Colonel, lieutenant colonel and major.) intermediate officers, (Note: Captains.) junior officers, (Note: First and second lieutenant. The officer candidate, considered a "special enlisted man", is superior to the enlisted men and is part of the junior officers' circle.) warrant officers and sergeants, (Note: Sub-lieutenant, first, second, and third sergeant.) and corporals and privates. In peacetime, the highest rank is that of army general. The rank of marshal may be created in wartime. Enlisted personnel can be called "graduados", except for privates, which form the lowest level of the hierarchy and are considered "non-graduated" military personnel.

The greatest separation in the career is between officers and praças (enlisted men), as the officers are the active leading element, trained from the beginning for command, while the enlisted men are trained to apply orders. Aside from this, there are mechanisms for merit-based social mobility, and the army emphasizes that every general was once a cadet, that is, a student at the officer academy.

Respect for the hierarchy must be maintained even outside of service and even upon retirement. There are rules of coexistence between different military circles (for example, sergeants and officers do not sit at the same table), and disrespecting them is known as "hierarchical promiscuity". There is always a superior and a subordinate between two soldiers. Within the same position, the difference is seniority. In the case of officers from the Military Academy of Agulhas Negras, seniority is defined by the date of the last promotion or, if it is the same, which is common among officers of the same class, by the classification (final grade average) at the academy.

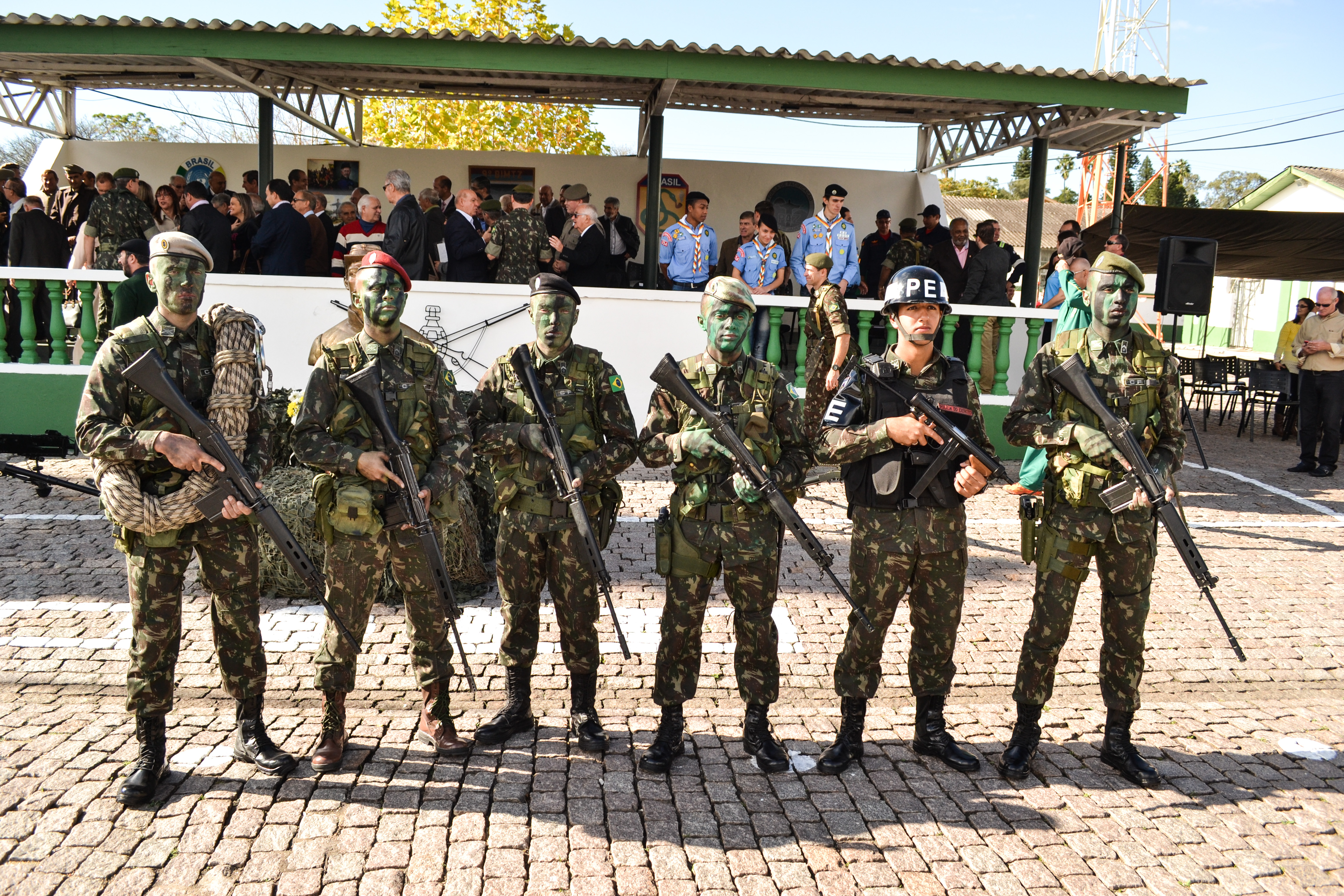
Different colors of infantry berets

Rank is indicated by insignia on the uniform, along with military organization badges and course badges and brevets. The most famous color in uniforms is olive green, which is one of the main elements of the army's visual identity. First adopted in 1931 in place of khaki, the color was also used on field uniforms until the 1990s, when the use of camouflage became widespread. (Note: Until then, camouflage was used among paratroopers, jungle troops and cadets. (Pedrosa, Uniformes do Exército Brasileiro (2022), p. 734).) Olive green is the standard color for berets, but specific troops distinguish themselves by different colors: red for paratroopers, brindle for jungle troops, marine blue for aviation, gray for mountain specialists, beige for the airmobile brigade, black for armored troops and steel blue for officer and sergeant training schools. Some units wear traditional historical uniforms, such as the Presidential Guard Battalion and the 1st Guard Cavalry Regiment.

==== Commissioned officer ranks ====
The rank insignia of commissioned officers.

Rank group	General / flag officers				Senior officers			Junior officers
Brazilian Army
Brazilian Army	Marechal	General de exército	General de divisão	General de brigada	Coronel	Tenente-coronel	Major	Capitão	Primeiro tenente	Segundo tenente

==== Other ranks ====
The rank insignia of non-commissioned officers and enlisted personnel.

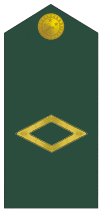
Rank group	Senior NCOs				Junior NCOs		Enlisted
Brazilian Army
Brazilian Army	Subtenente	Primeiro-sargento	Segundo-sargento	Terceiro-sargento	Taifeiro-mor	Cabo	Taifeiro primeira classe	Taifeiro segunda classe	Soldado

=== Military instruction ===
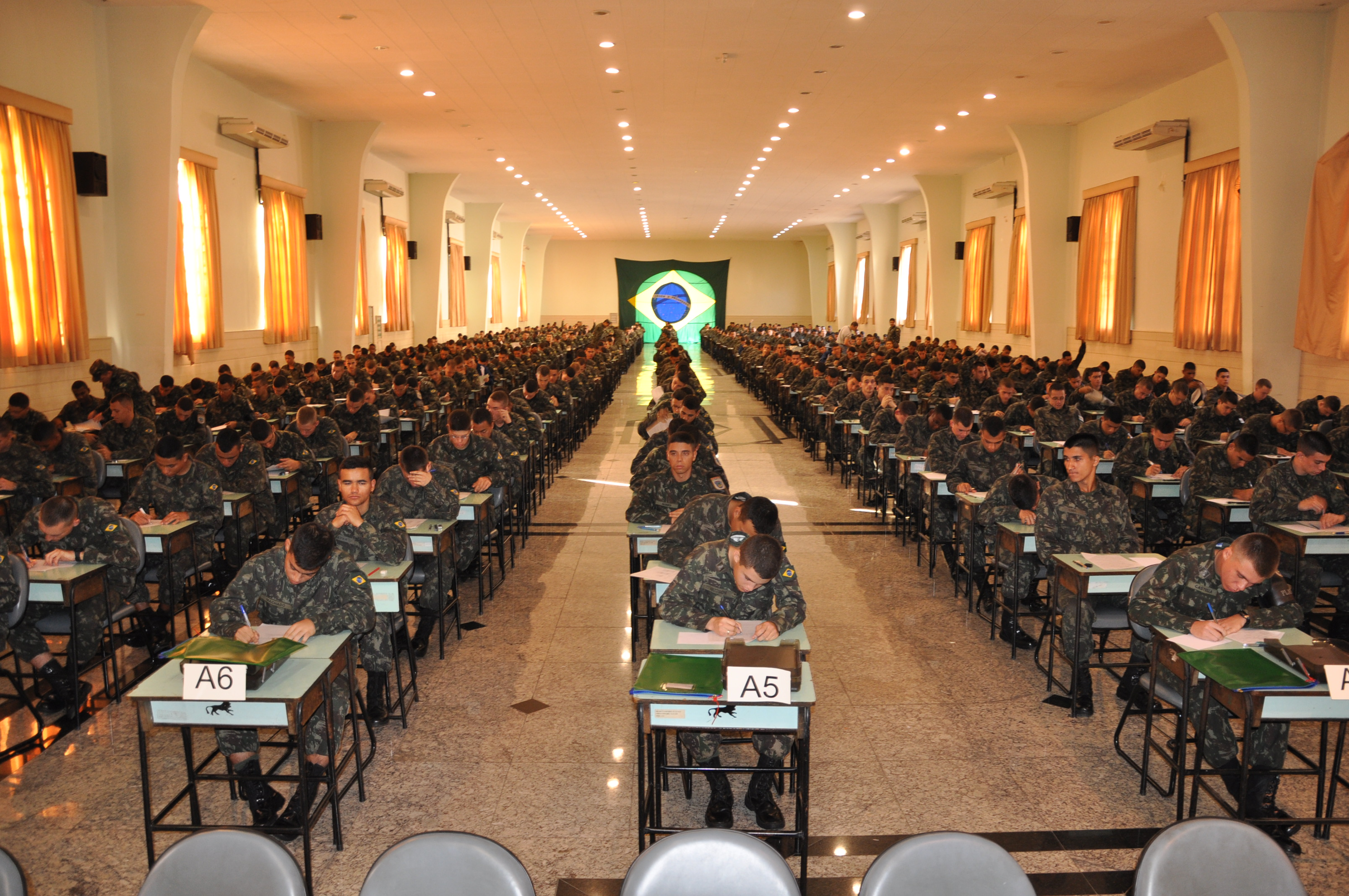
Army Cadet Preparatory School

Military teaching and instruction can be defined as the army's main missions in peacetime. This system encompasses education, instruction, and research. Privates' and corporals' activities correspond to elementary education, sergeants' to secondary, technical or higher education (technologist) and officers' to higher education. (Note: Oliveira & Mathias, Profissionalização militar (2020), p. 52. The authors only mentioned the sergeants' secondary or technical education, but the Escola de Sargentos das Armas é of higher education (technologist).) Practically all military organizations have some responsibility for training soldiers. Active-duty organizations have a fixed personnel, but annually train a variable number of reservists. There are organizations exclusively focused on reservists: the Reserve Officer Training Bodies (Órgãos de Formação de Oficiais da Reserva; OFOR), which consist of the Preparation Centers (Centros de Preparação; CPOR) and the Preparation Nuclei (Núcleos de Preparação; NPOR), and the Tiros de Guerra. Other organizations train career military personnel (officers and sergeants). By law, military education is regulated exclusively by the army itself.

Officers in the military education line, who carry out the army's core activity (warfare), enter the institution early, in the equivalent of the first year of higher education. After the Army Cadet Preparatory School (Escola Preparatória de Cadetes do Exército; EsPCEx), in Campinas, they graduate from AMAN, in Resende. Officers' careers are organized into study cycles; AMAN trains officer candidates, a degree from the Officer Improvement School (Escola de Aperfeiçoamento de Oficiais; EsAO) is necessary for promotion to major, and a degree from the Army Command and General Staff School (Escola de Comando e Estado-Maior do Exército; ECEME), to brigadier general. The AMAN degree is a bachelor's degree in Military Sciences, EsAO's degree is a master's degree in Military Operations, and ECEME's degree is a doctorate in Military Policy, Strategy and Administration; ECEME also offers a post-doctorate program.

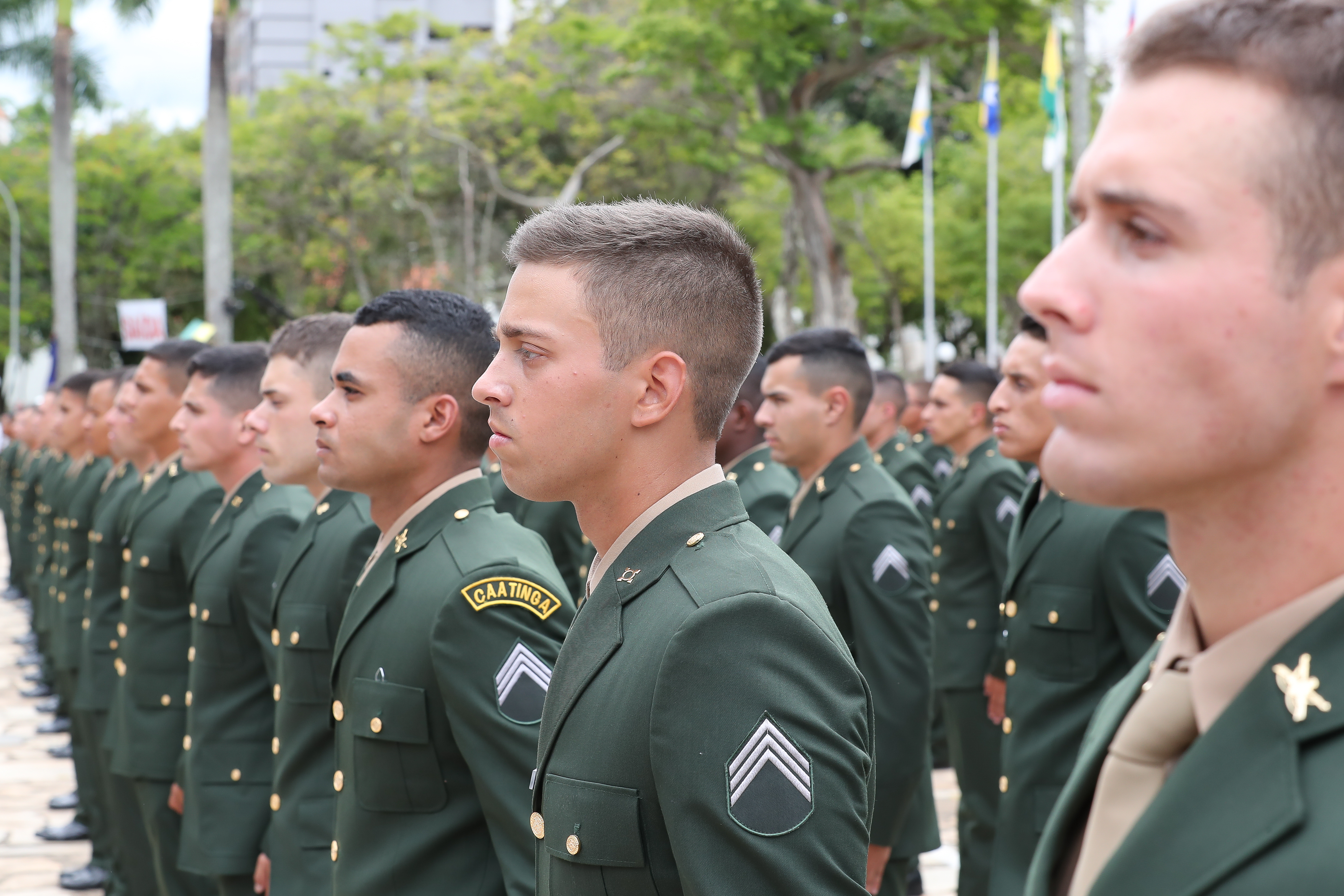
Escola de Sargentos das Armas

Career combat sergeants graduate in two years, the first in one of the thirteen Army Technological School Units (Unidades Escolares Tecnológicas do Exército; UETE) spread across the country and the second in the Combatant Sergeants' School (Escola de Sargentos das Armas; ESA), Logistics Sergeants School (Escola de Sargentos de Logística; EsSLog) or Army Aviation Instruction Center (Centro de Instrução de Aviação do Exército; CIAvEx). EsAO's equivalent is the Sergeants' Branches Improvement School (Escola de Aperfeiçoamento de Sargentos das Armas; EASA). The Military Institute of Engineering (Instituto Militar de Engenharia; IME), Army School of Health and Complementary Training (Escola de Saúde e Formação Complementar do Exército; EsFCEx) and the School of Specialized Instruction (Escola de Instrução Especializada; EsIE), among others, also participate in teaching sergeants and/or officers.

The schools are complemented by specialization courses, extension courses and internships. In 2006, there were 66 specialization courses for officers and 76 for sergeants, eight extension courses for officers and six for sergeants, 47 internships for officers and 32 for sergeants. This even covers education that is not strictly military, such as language courses offered by the Center for Personnel Studies. In the most difficult and coveted operational courses, such as those for commandos, jungle warriors and pathfinders, the rate of voluntary dismissal is high.

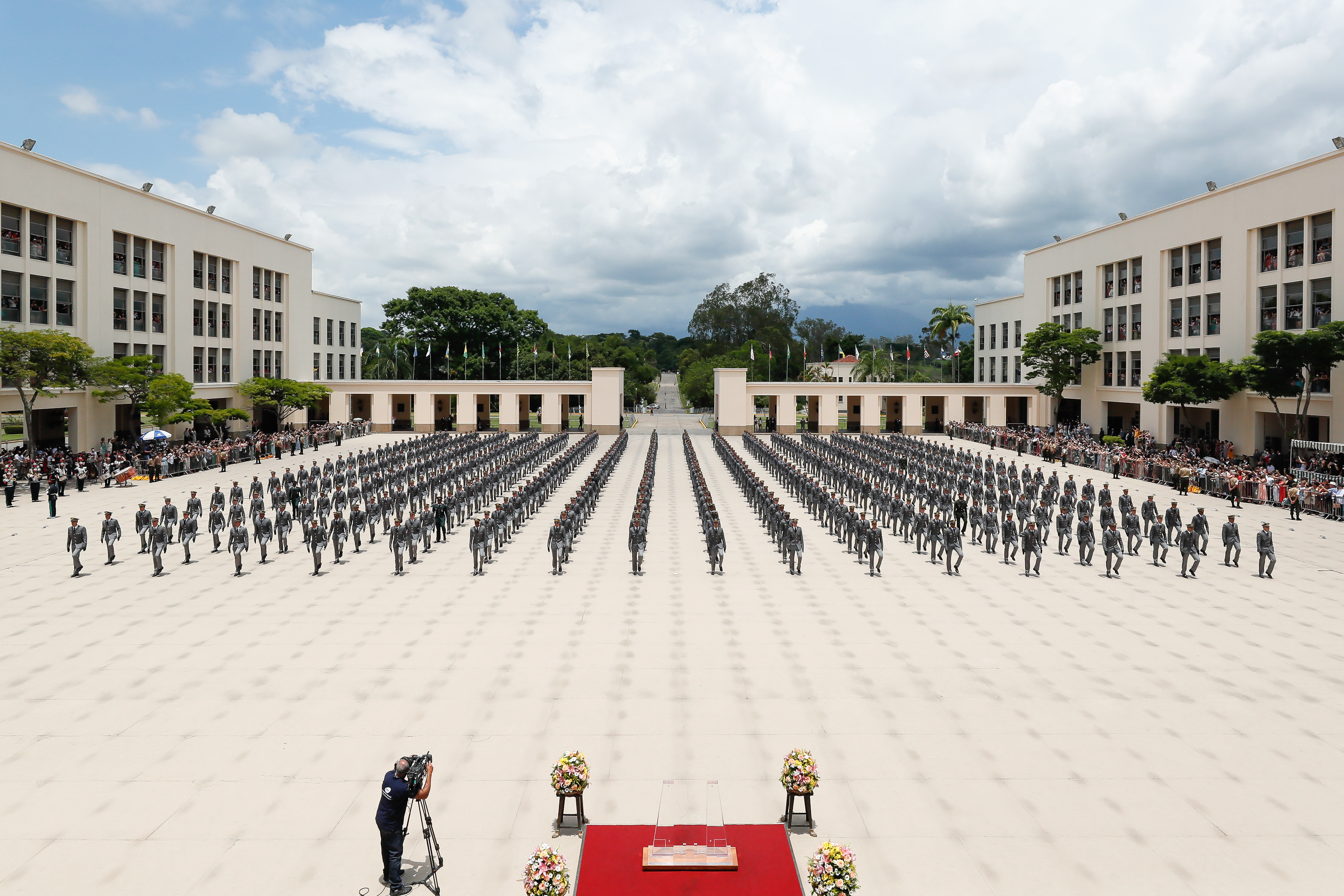
Military Academy of Agulhas Negras

The Brazilian Army also maintains twelve Military Schools, at primary and secondary level, but their students do not necessarily pursue a military career. These schools offer the possibility of keeping officers' children in military education from a very early age. The Military Instruction Schools (Escolas de Instrução Militar; EsIM) are also secondary education, designed to allow students to carry out military service without interrupting their studies.

According to the army, the training is rigorous, but ill-treatment, violence against lower ranks and bodily injuries are isolated cases and the instructions are controlled to avoid risks. Cases of violence by instructors exist; from 2005 to June 2015, the Rio de Janeiro Military Court judged 299 incidents in the army, navy and air force. Critics point to the institution's corporatism as an obstacle to complaints. The aggressors are tried in the Military Court, but the compensation is paid by the federal government. An emblematic case was that of cadet Márcio Lapoente da Silveira, who died during training at AMAN in 1990, leading to a complaint to the Inter-American Commission on Human Rights. The superior officer involved later reached the rank of colonel.

=== Branches, cadres and services ===
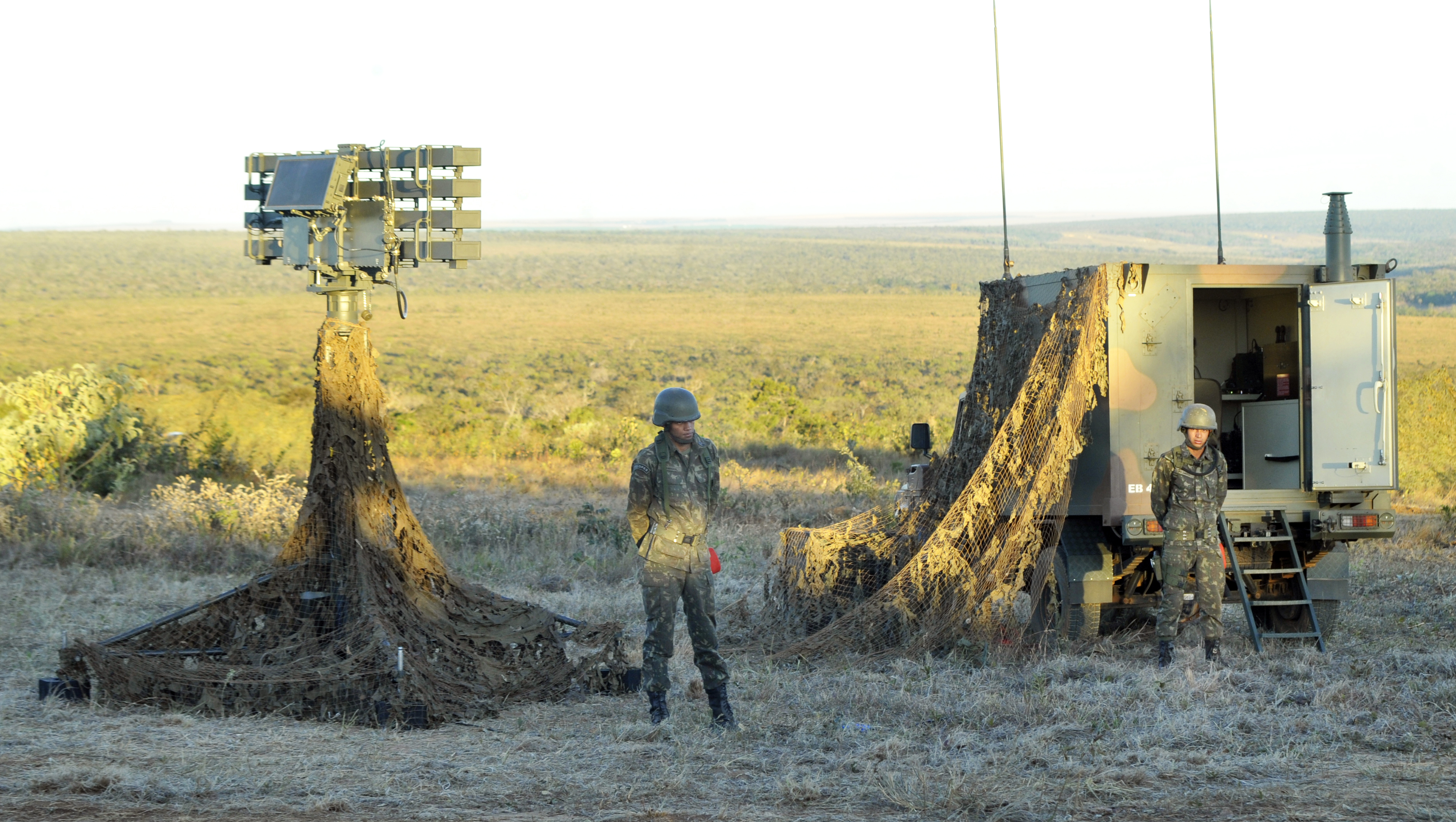
Anti-aircraft artillery radar

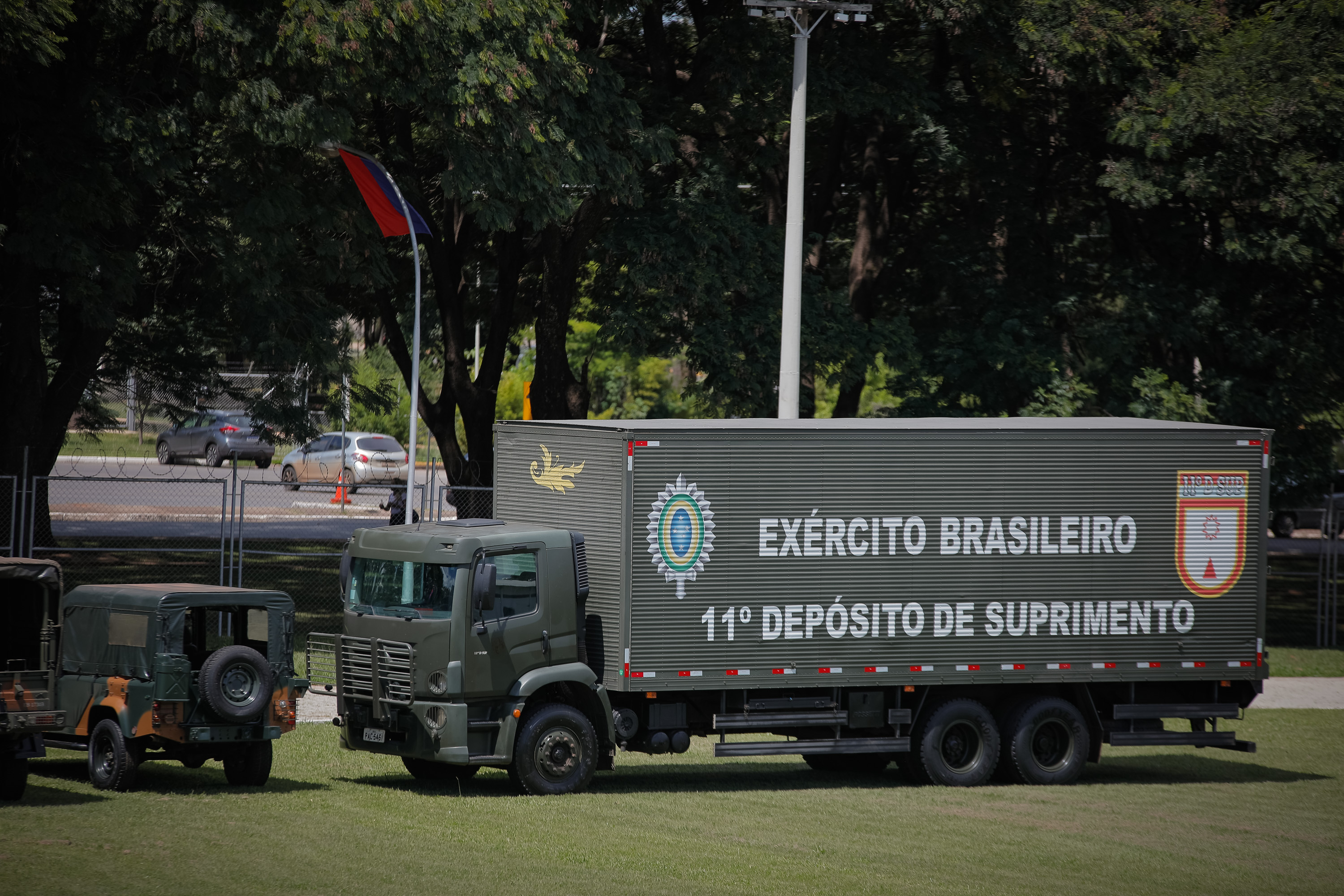
Quartermaster supply truck

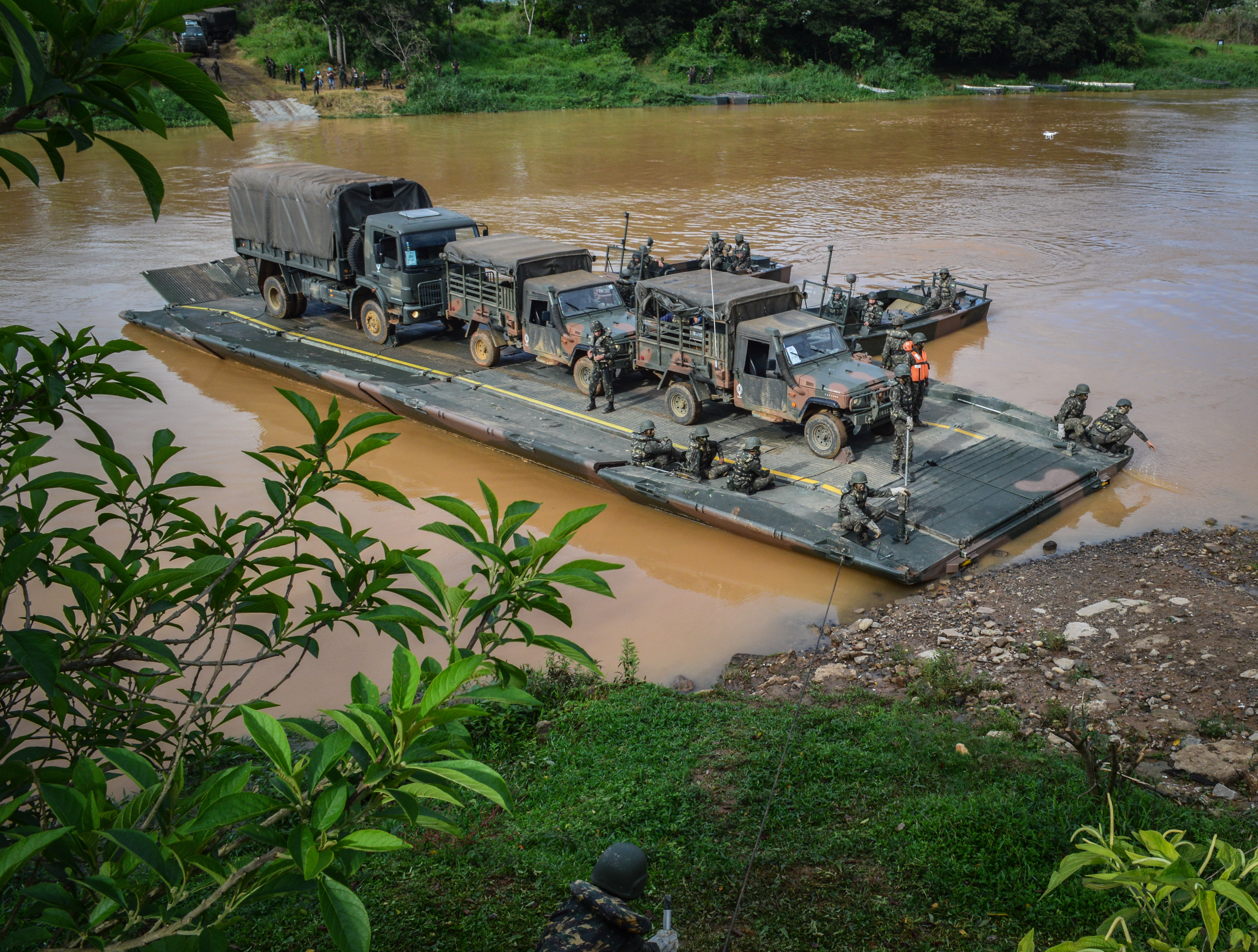
River transposition with Engineering work

Troops are subdivided into several specialties, called "branches" (armas), "cadres" (quadros) and "services" (serviços), according to their missions and characteristics. Seven of them, the military education line, directly carry out military operations, and their officers are exclusively trained at AMAN; they are the infantry, cavalry, engineering, artillery and communications branches, the Quartermaster Service (Serviço de Intendência) and the Ordnance Cadre (Quadro de Material Bélico). Colloquially, they are called "armas". Infantry and Cavalry are the so-called "base branches" (armas base), as they come into direct contact with the enemy. Artillery directly participates in combat, but from a distance, providing fire support. Engineering and communications are support branches, but they also act directly on the battlefield. Quartermasters and Ordnance are the theater of operations's logistics.

The other areas of officers, with different origins, are the Military Engineers (Quadro de Engenheiros Militares; QEM), Auxiliary Officers (Quadro Auxiliar de Oficiais; QAO) and Complementary Officers (Quadro Complementar de Oficiais; QCO) and the Health and Religious Assistance Services. Army Aviation, which is not a branch, has officers from different branches. Warrant officers and sergeants belong to their own Military Qualifications (Qualificações Militares de Sargentos; QMS), covering, in addition to the seven areas of AMAN, Communications Maintenance, Topography, Aviation Maintenance, Aviation Support, Music and Health.

Officers and NCOs choose the branch in which they will serve during their training. This decision accompanies the soldier for the rest of his career and determines where he will serve and what commands he will be able to exercise. However, more than a specialty, the branch is a social atmosphere of its own, determining the soldier's companions for the remainder of his career. Along with the class in which an officer graduated, the branch is the basic component of an officer's identity. Temperament and disposition are presumed from branch collar insignia. Each branch has a "spirit", an association between the personal characteristics required in military operations and the individual's personality: "rustic" infantrymen, "fast" cavalrymen, "methodical" artillerymen, and so on. There are even negative stereotypes attributed to each branch by the others.

The best students, based on the general classification, choose their branch first, and the last ones are "compelled" to fill the remaining vacancies. Until the 1990s, the students' preferred branches were infantry, cavalry and artillery, prestigious for being the combat ones, to which the most famous generals in the history of the army belonged. From then on, the Quartermaster and Ordnance, areas closest to civilian activity, became the most sought after by the new generations of cadets.

=== Officers ===
==== Subdivisions ====
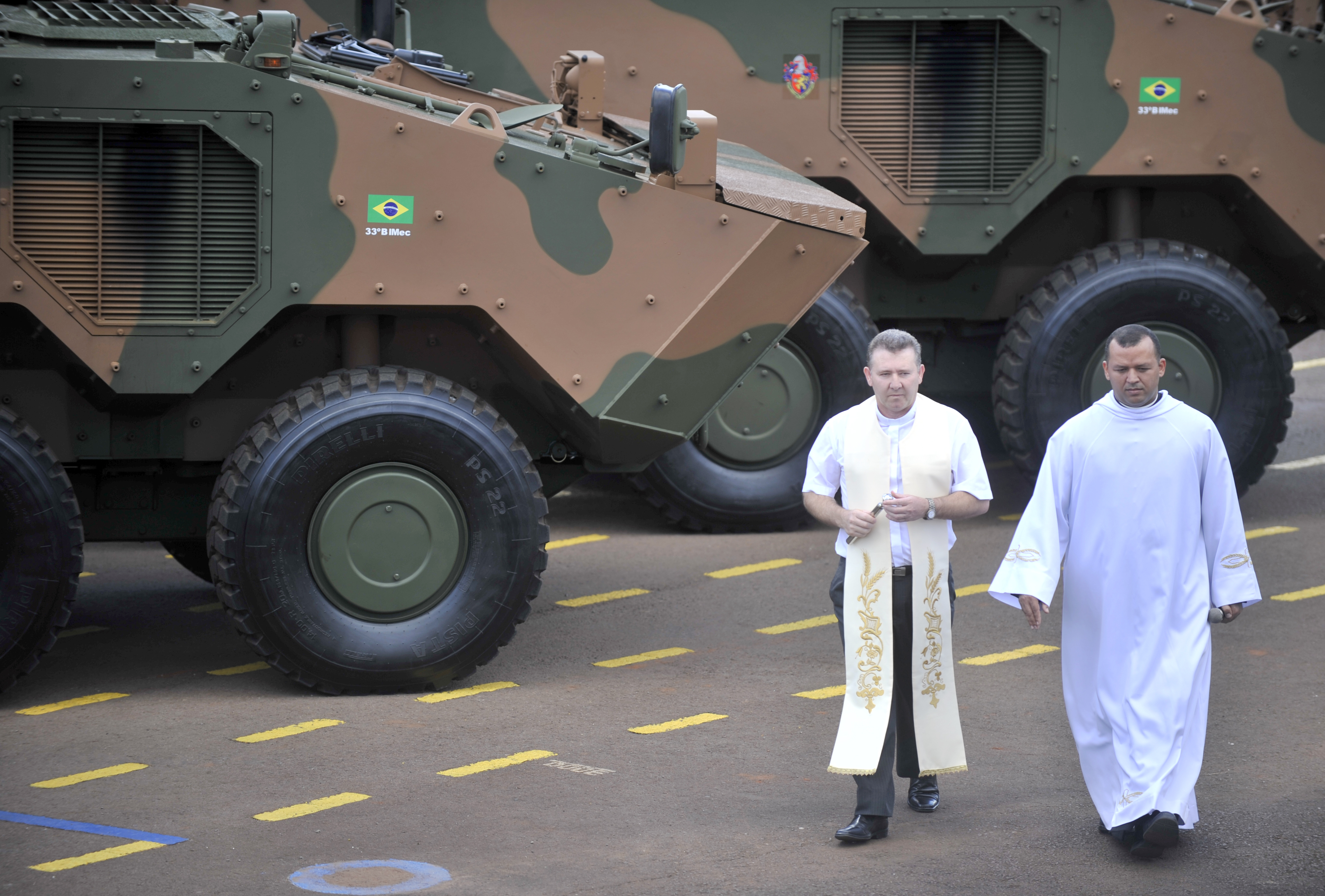
Army chaplains

Career officers from the military education line, also called "AMAN officers" or "academy officers", are the backbone and elite of the institution, in which the army invests to represent it legitimately and, in the future, lead it. They are the majority of generals and all army generals, the top of the hierarchy. But there are several other officer careers.

2nd category reserve officers (R/2) are recruited through OFOR. The Military Engineers Cadre (QEM) (not be confused with the military line Engineering Branch), is trained at the Military Engineering Institute and has skills closer to those of a university-trained engineer. A QEM engineer works in science, technology and the production of weapons. The Auxiliary Officer Cadre (QAO) is made up of sergeants and warrant officers promoted to the officer ranks. The Army's School of Health and Complementary Training trains the officers of the Complementary Cadre of Officers (QCO), Health Cadre (QSau) and Military Chaplains Cadre; QCO officers already have a prior degree in a civil higher education course, and military chaplains have prior training as Catholic or evangelical ministers. Temporary Technical Officers (Oficiais Técnicos Temporários; OTT), also with prior academic training, are recruited after an internship and remain for up to eight years.

==== Profile ====
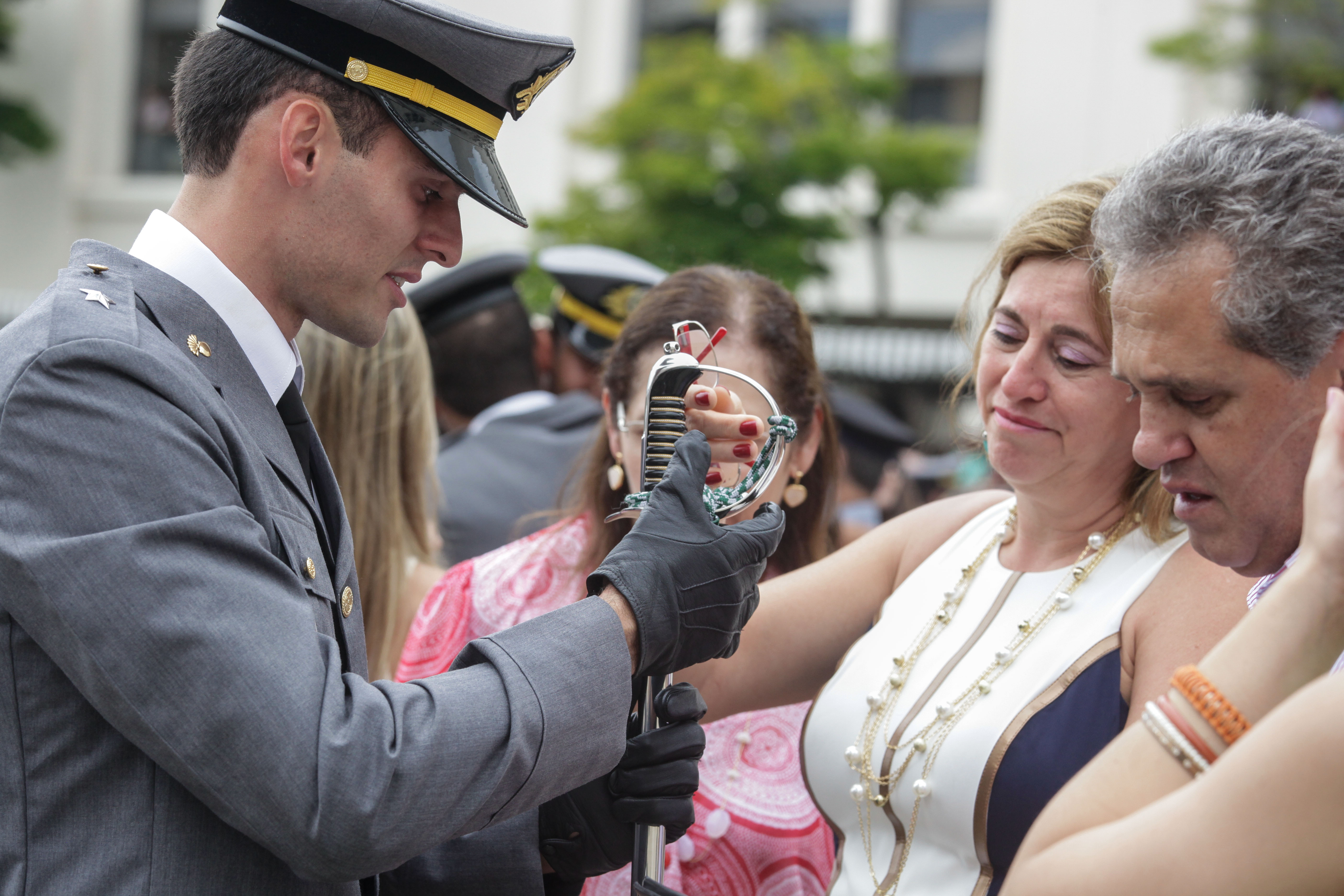
AMAN officer candidate with his family at the graduation ceremony

The majority of officers come from middle-class families, often with military parents, in a pattern of endogenous recruitment that has existed since at least the 20th century. Increasingly, in the last decades of the 20th century, these military parents are junior officers and enlisted men seeking social advancement through lifelong public service. The children of senior officers often attend civilian universities. Salaries have historically maintained officers in the middle class.

Young people do not enter AMAN thinking about leaving the military career in the future, or if they do, they are conditioned to change their minds. Officer status will follow each person until death. Permanent availability, exclusive dedication (i.e, the legal impossibility of assuming other positions), geographic mobility and restriction of labor rights are the characteristics of the career, according to the army. Geographic mobility means a nomadic career, with constant transfers. The result is a homogeneous army, but this brings difficulties for the officer's family and prevents rooting in local society. Due to exclusive dedication, the army advised against taking degrees outside the military, but this is changing in the 21st century.

An academy officer's contacts are established primarily within the institution. Officers and their families share a large part of their living, leisure and study environments, and the institution promotes internal social interaction, in which wives are fundamental. The family's presentation and behavior influence how an officer is qualified in professional life. The military family is also a bridge between the army and society as a whole. The notion of "Military Family" can be broad, encompassing military personnel and their families.

The profile of QCO officers is different, as they bring the worldview of academia and broader society into the army. R/2 officers have a different social origin: they are mainly university students, and the declared objective of the course is the "education of citizens, future members of the national elite and who have knowledge mainly of the values that are the bases of the Brazilian Army".

==== Career ====
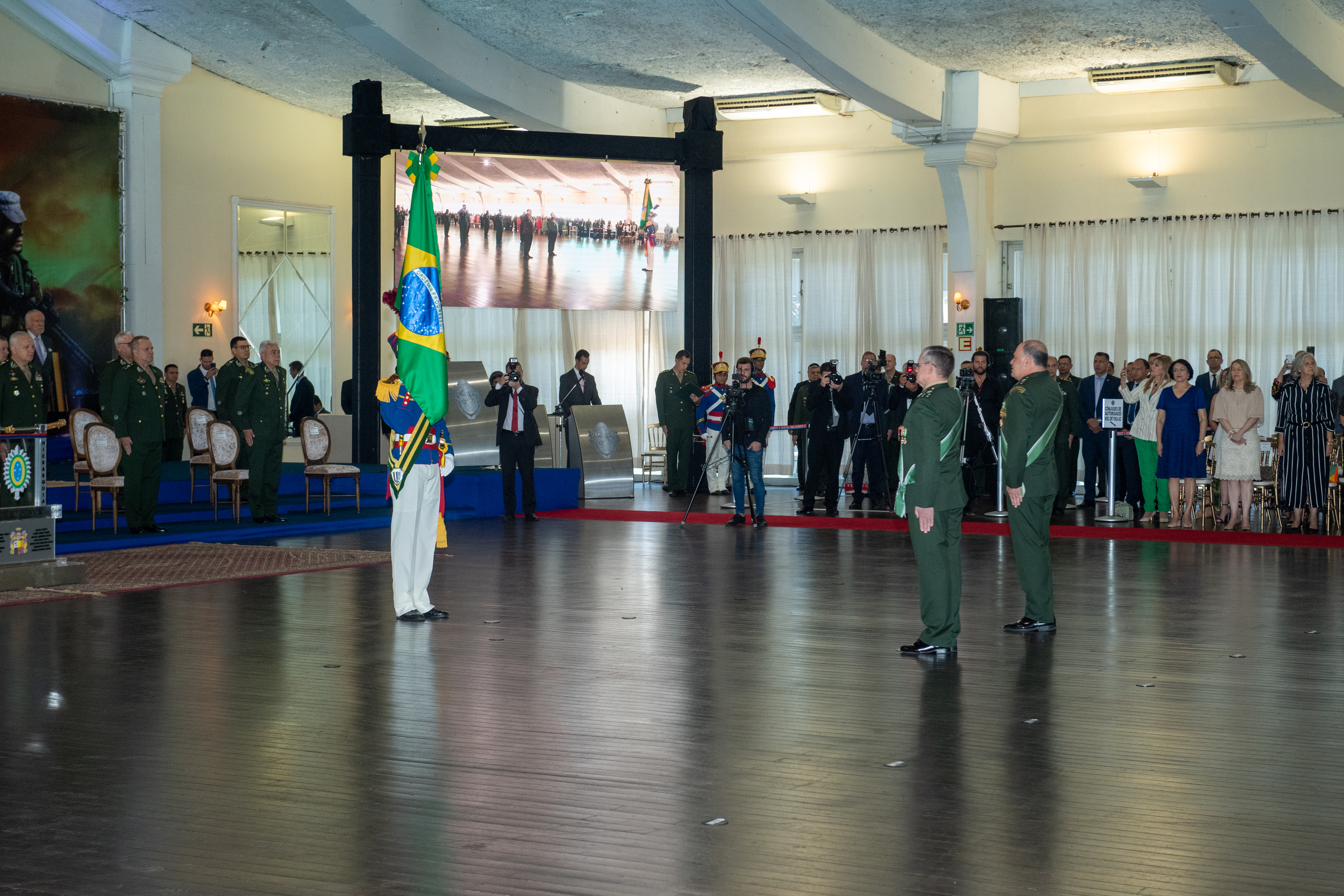
General promotion ceremony

Out of a class of 400 AMAN officer candidates, only four become army generals. Rising through officer ranks takes decades and involves the principles of seniority, merit, choice, and in wartime, bravery. An example of a successful officer, Fernando Azevedo e Silva graduated from AMAN in 1976 and was promoted to army general in 2014. The political-military leaders of the 1960s graduated from the Military School of Realengo in the 1910s to 1930s.

An officer's year of formation reveals his rank, his AMAN class (a group with great familiarity with each other and their own name, such as the "Independence Centennial" of 1989), and within it, his seniority. (Note: Santos & Raposo, A elite do Exército (2019), p. 65-72. Promotions for each position occur at the same time, and student classes trained at AMAN are promoted with a maximum difference of one year between the first and last student. AMAN's classification influences which ones will receive the best opportunities, and the "zero-one" student, the best classified one (oldest) in his respective branch, cadre or service, has a lot of expectations on his shoulders.) There is a period of eight to ten years from AMAN to EsAO and three to ten years from there to ECEME. About a third of each class manages to enter ECEME, through which officers enter the Active Duty General Staff Cadre (Quadro de Estado-Maior da Ativa; QEMA). This opens up advisory and decision-making functions to them, and therefore, greater prestige and power. The other officers are part of the General Supplementary Cadre (Quadro Suplementar Geral; QSG), where they will have bureaucratic and/or executive functions until the end of their career. Only QEMA officers achieve generalship.

Once it's time for promotions to general, most of the class requests a transfer to the paid reserve. Only a minority is promoted to brigadier general, a political decision whose criterion is choice. (Note: Santos & Raposo, A elite do Exército (2019), p. 69. The system is strictly "up or out", in the definitions of Hudson, Brazil: a country study (1998).) The decision involves the Army High Command and the President of Brazil, who traditionally respects the names indicated by the High Command. Promoting a candidate junior to his peers usually pushes them to the reserve. An officer spends a maximum of twelve years as an active duty general.

=== Warrant officers and sergeants ===
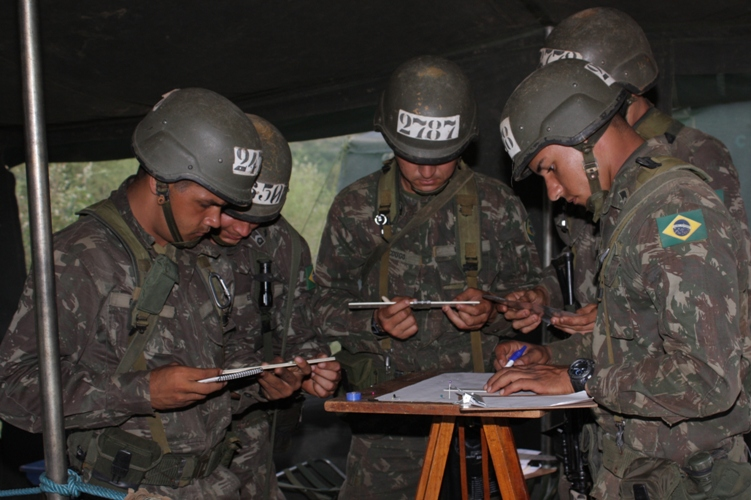
ESA's Artillery Course topography exercise

The motto "sergeant, the fundamental link between the command and the troops" summarizes the role assigned by the army to this rank. The sergeant is both a leader and executor. In general, he is the one who maintains direct contact with the privates, for whom he has the responsibility to discipline. His training aims to create a practical executor, who, if necessary, puts into practice what the officer thinks, but does not know how to execute.

Sergeants have never been an elite, but their training is a priority, albeit secondary to that of officers. A career sergeant is expected to have obedience to officers, critical thinking, greater culture and technical-professional preparation than his subordinates and a robust professional identity. The students at the Sergeants' Branches School are, for the most part, the children of civilians, but many have previous military experience, especially in mandatory military service. They are older than AMAN cadets (18–28 years old upon joining, most often in the 20–24 range) and from families with lower incomes.

Officers and sergeants in a military organization come from all over the country and transfer throughout their career. Among sergeants, this is less frequent and over shorter distances. In his career, marked by training, specialization and improvement courses, the sergeant acquires professional stability after ten years of service. Having graduated as a third sergeant, he can rise to sub-lieutenant or captain of the Auxiliary Officer Cadre. There are also temporary sergeants who were privates that rose through military service and temporary technical sergeants, who are volunteers incorporated through an internship.

=== Corporals and privates ===
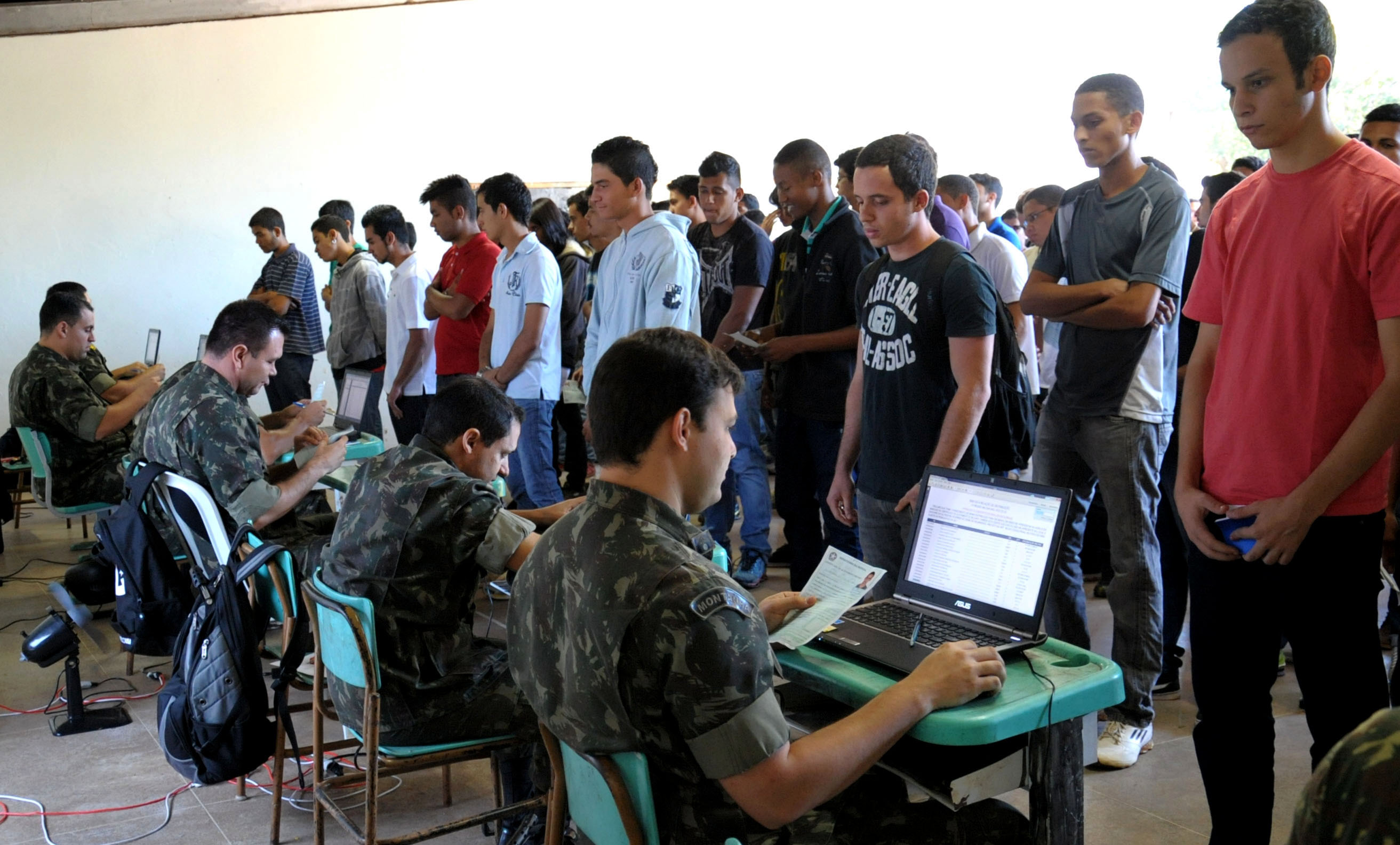
Young men presenting themselves for the selection phase of military service in 2014

Privates in combat units are incorporated through initial mandatory military service. Enlistment is mandatory for men the year they turn 18. Of the three singular forces, the army is the one that most depends on compulsory military service. Conscripts are a considerable part of its force, unlike the navy and air force, in which they are a small minority. There are several alternatives to this type of military service, (Note: Kuhlmann, Razões da permanência do modelo de recrutamento no Brasil (2001), p. 72. There are also Medicine, Pharmacy, Dentistry or Veterinary Medicine students who perform mandatory military service as officers, R/2 reserve officers and students from Military Instruction Schools; see the Military Service Directorate.) including the Tiros de Guerra, dispersed in municipalities across the country, where reservist privates, known as atiradores (shooters), have part-time training.

Military Service Boards, the lowest administrative level of conscription, are present throughout the entire country. However, only in tributary municipalities, chosen for geographic and economic reasons, will enlisted men continue to the next stages of the process. Each military organization will receive recruits from the surrounding areas. By the end of the process, around 5% of those enlisted are sent into active service. In 2012, 92% were volunteers, according to the Army.

The official justifications for the system are the same as those made by its defenders (such as Olavo Bilac) when compulsory military service was implemented at the beginning of the 20th century. According to Enzo Martins Peri, the army commander in 2007–2015, the current model is "more democratic, universal and, socially, more fair and equitable" and complements the "formation of citizenship in the spiritual, moral, physical, intellectual, professional and civic aspects". The army seeks to mold recruits into an ideal of an orderly, productive and patriotic citizen and even undertakes professional qualification initiatives, (Note: For example, through Citizen Soldier Project, existing since 2004 with the objective of "professionally qualifying recruits who provide Military Service, complementing their civic-citizen training and facilitating their entry into the job market, after the mandatory period in the Armed Forces".) but this social function only applies to a small minority of enlisted personnel called up for service. In the case of the Tiros de Guerra, the low frequency of military exercises, leaving most of the time to cleaning, maintaining facilities and civic-social activities, can be a factor of frustration.

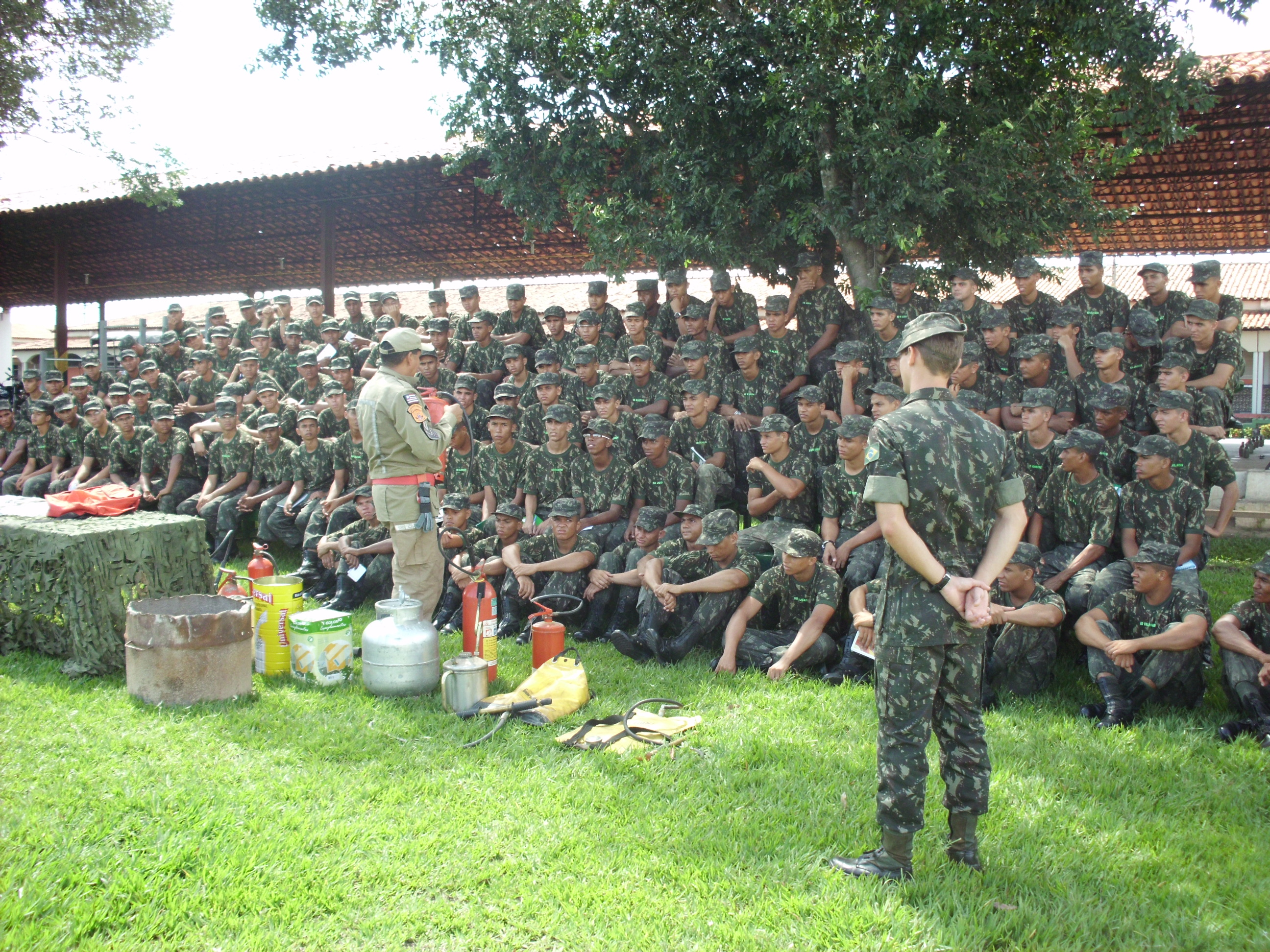
Recruit training at the 50th Jungle Infantry Battalion

The ideal of compulsory military service as a republican leveler, in which all social classes serve, does not correspond to reality. Young people are mostly recruited from low-income families, for whom military service is an alternative to the lack of opportunities in the job market. A recruit's pay, however, is less than minimum wage.

The recruits, or variable force privates (Efetivo Variável; EV), serve for one year, (Note: Which can be extended for another six months, in the interest of the army. See the Military Service Directorate.) during which they are meant to be transformed into a reservist fit for combat. The recruit is only considered ready in the last part of the cycle, the training period, which lasts around four months. This creates an operational gap of two-thirds of the year. One of the solutions is to vary the schedules so that, throughout the year, some units are operational and others are not. It is not clear in which part of the year the entire army would be trained and ready.

Privates are temporary personnel and do not pursue a career. Volunteers interested in serving for more than twelve months can re-engage, that is, extend their time of service, depending on vacancies and the army's judgment. The reengaged private moves from the EV to the Base Core (Núcleo Base; NB), which also includes career military personnel. NB privates undertake professional training and advancement courses, and may be promoted to corporal or temporary sergeant. Re-engagements can be requested annually up to a maximum of 96 months of service. (Note: In other words, less than the ten years necessary for job stability, as provided for by labor legislation; Furthermore, the professionalization of enlisted ranks is traditionally considered within the army as a threat to discipline (McCann, The Brazilian Armed Forces (2017), p. 75).) The goal set in 1998 was to have a workforce of 75% NB and 25% EV. Some brigades have more professional personnel; the Parachute Infantry Brigade is made up entirely of volunteers, and the 26th Parachute Infantry Battalion is made up exclusively of NB personnel.

=== Women ===
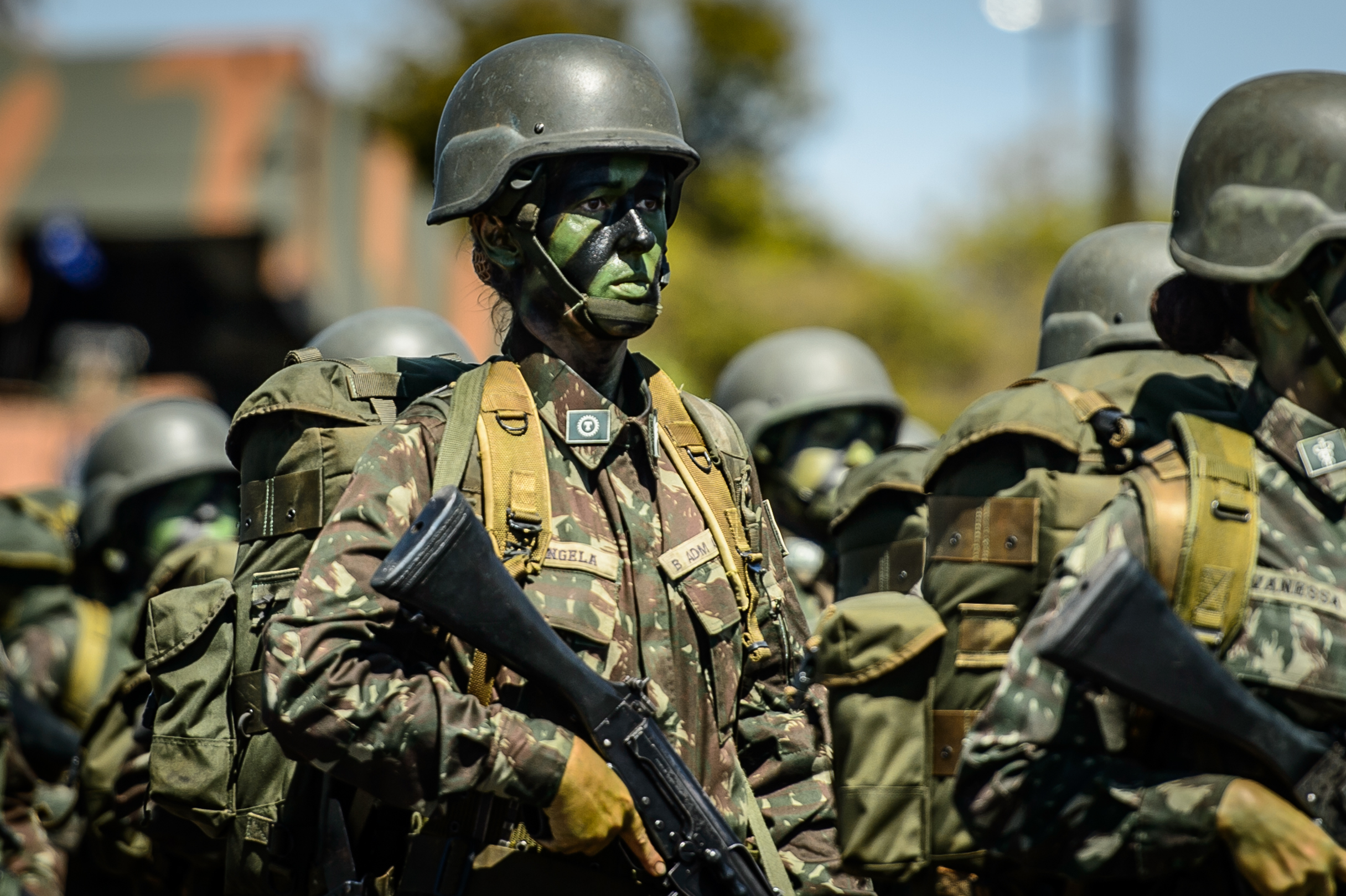
Female army soldier

Women are exempt from mandatory military service in Brazil, but may volunteer as career or temporary military personnel. The Brazilian Army was the first in South America to allow women as career soldiers.

The first formal participation of women in the Brazilian Army was in 1943, with FEB nurses. Female participation returned in 1992, following changes in society and the opening of the navy and air force to women. Initially occupying administrative and technical positions in QCO, throughout the decade women were also admitted to the Health Staff, the Military Engineers Staff and the temporary officers and sergeants staff.

EsPCEx welcomed its first female students in 2017, opening the military line to women, but they can only choose the Quartermaster and Ordnance branches. The army plans to open the communications branch to women in 2024. Women made up about 6% of active personnel in 2023.

=== Reserve ===
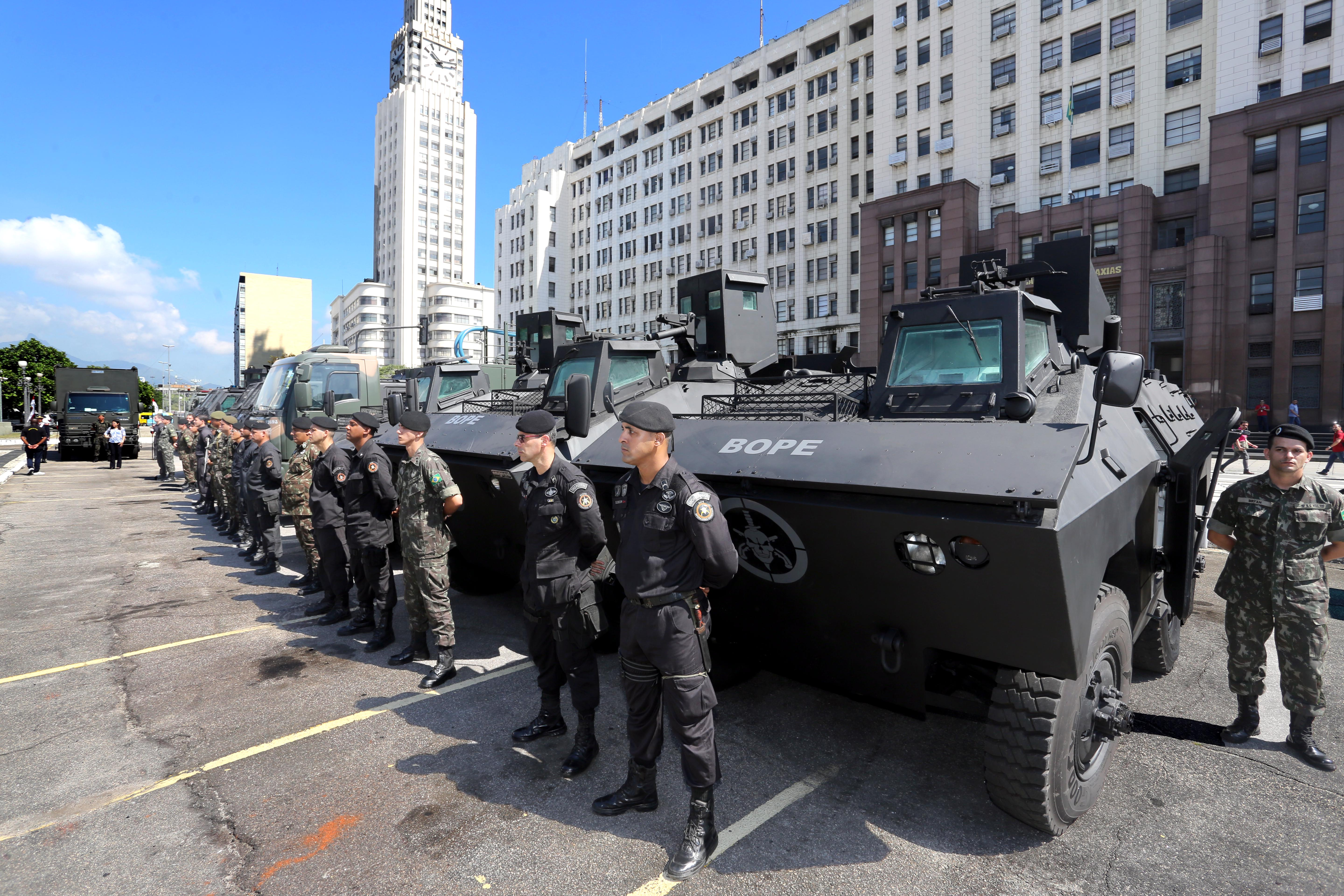
Delivery of army armored vehicles to the Military Police of Rio de Janeiro, one of its auxiliary and reserve forces

At the end of active service, soldiers join the reserve, from where they can still be called up in a war or emergency. Officers and NCOs with at least 30 years of service, known as R1 military personnel, join the paid reserve. Only upon reaching an age limit or physical incapacity is a paid reserve officer or NCO released from mobilization and, instead of a reservist, becomes a reformado. Ostracism and difficulty adjusting to civilian life are among the army's reasons for financing its pensioners and reservists.

Temporary military personnel are part of the unpaid reserve. For five years after the end of service, the "availability" period, they are subject to the Reserve Presentation Exercise (Exercício de Apresentação da Reserva; EXAR). Every year, a certain number of reservists are called up to renew their skills and participate in an operation. According to historian Frank McCann, the reserve is immense, but there has never been a full call-up, and therefore, it is not known whether it would be successful. There is no organized reserve like in the United States, with reserve units responsible for preserving the skills of these soldiers.

In principle, the 1988 Brazilian constitution designates the Military Police (Polícias Militares; PMs) and Military Fire Brigades (Corpos de Bombeiros Militares; CBMs) as auxiliary and reserve forces of the army, although in practice they remain separate entities, at state rather than federal scope. The military police, unlike the Armed Forces, deal with the Brazilian population and not with an external enemy. The army controls these institutions through the General Inspectorate of Military Police (Inspetoria Geral das Polícias Militares; IGPM). The army's interference in the PM's internal affairs has reduced since the end of the military dictatorship, but it still has veto powers. The IISS includes the military police in the category of "gendarmerie & paramilitary", estimating 395 thousand men.

== Traditions and culture ==
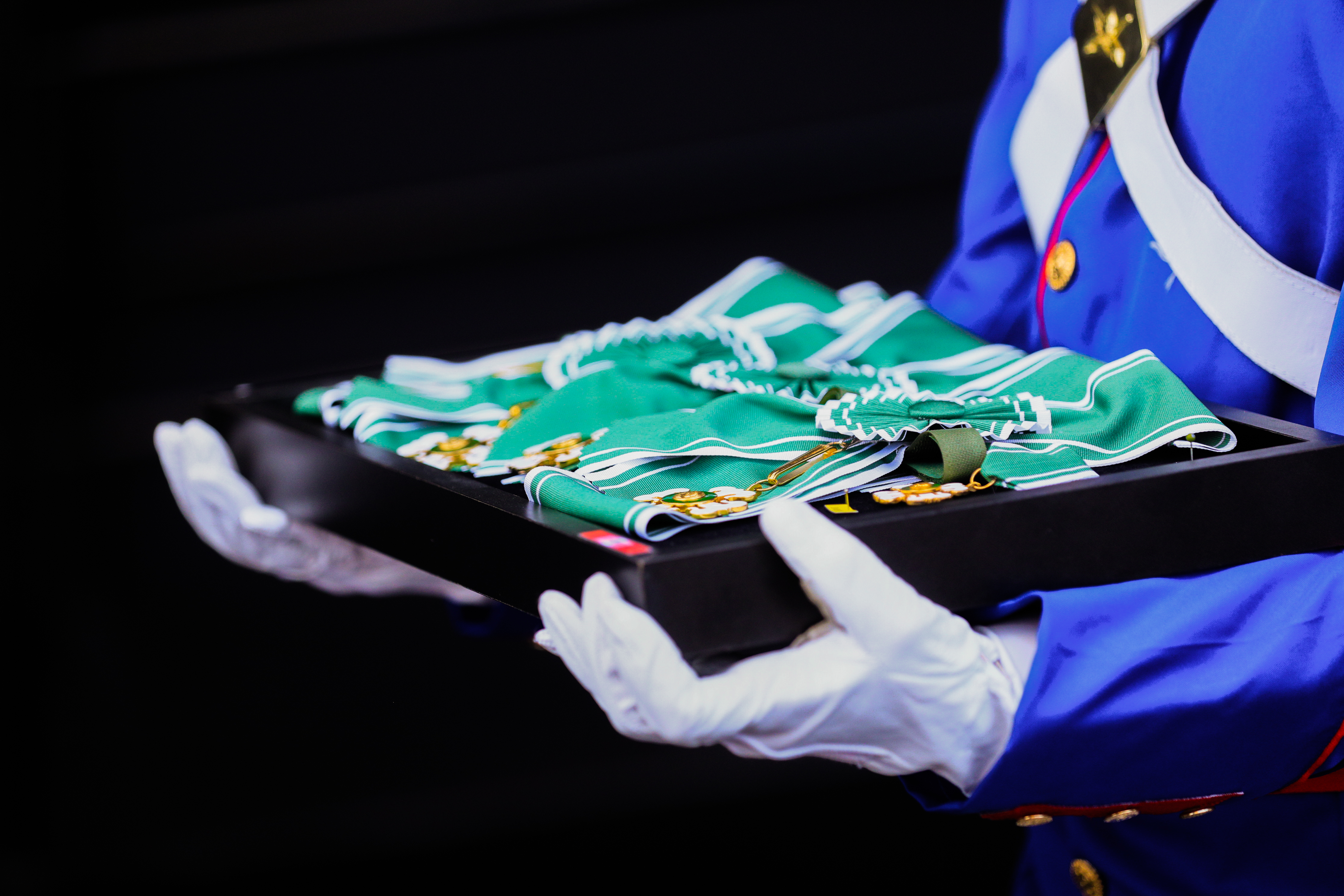
Army medals

The army clings to its values and identity even as it modernizes; in this sense, it is a conservative institution. Incorporating individuals from society transforms them more than they transform it. Lieutenant colonel and sociologist Everton Araújo dos Santos defined it: "conservative, traditional, hermetic, austere, reserved and averse to investigations", having "very well delineated contours of the social roles to be played by each of the individuals who compose it". The army can also be conservative externally, in relation to civil society and the State.

Military values are based on a distinction between the "inside" and "outside" worlds; the military world is considered more organized, honest, and patriotic than the civilian one. According to the Military Statute, the "essential manifestations of military value" are patriotism, "civic virtue and the cult of historical traditions", "faith in the elevated mission of the Armed Forces", esprit de corps, love for the profession and technical-professional improvement.

To protect itself from external influences, the army offers services so that "upon entering it, its member [can], within and throughout his life, in isolation and protected in a familiar and sufficient world, see a good part of his needs satisfied, and those of his dependents". The army's own healthcare system, FUSEx, covers all healthcare needs and is mandatory for military personnel and pensioners to participate in. When traveling, officers, sergeants, and dependents can be accommodated in army transit hotels. Catholic priests and evangelical pastors are assimilated as officers to cover religious service. There are leisure areas exclusive to the "internal public", such as the Imbuí beach, in Niterói. It is possible to reach generalship by attending, from childhood, only military institutions, and the highest priority of military education is moral training, thus serving as yet another protection mechanism.

To reinforce established practices and behaviors, giving them the respectability of the past, and to assign an identity to the army and specific units, the institution upholds traditions, usually symbols, rites, and ceremonies. These include the cult of "patrons", the order of precedence between branches, cadres, and services, the noble or honor halls, the galleries of former commanders, the "historical denominations" of military organizations, the army's motto (Note: "Braço Forte, Mão Amiga", established by the Army Social Communication Center in 1992, replacing "Army: Security and Integration" (Pedrosa, Tradições do Exército Brasileiro (2022), p. 725).) and the designation of the First Battle of Guararapes as the landmark of the force's founding.

=== Patrons and dates ===
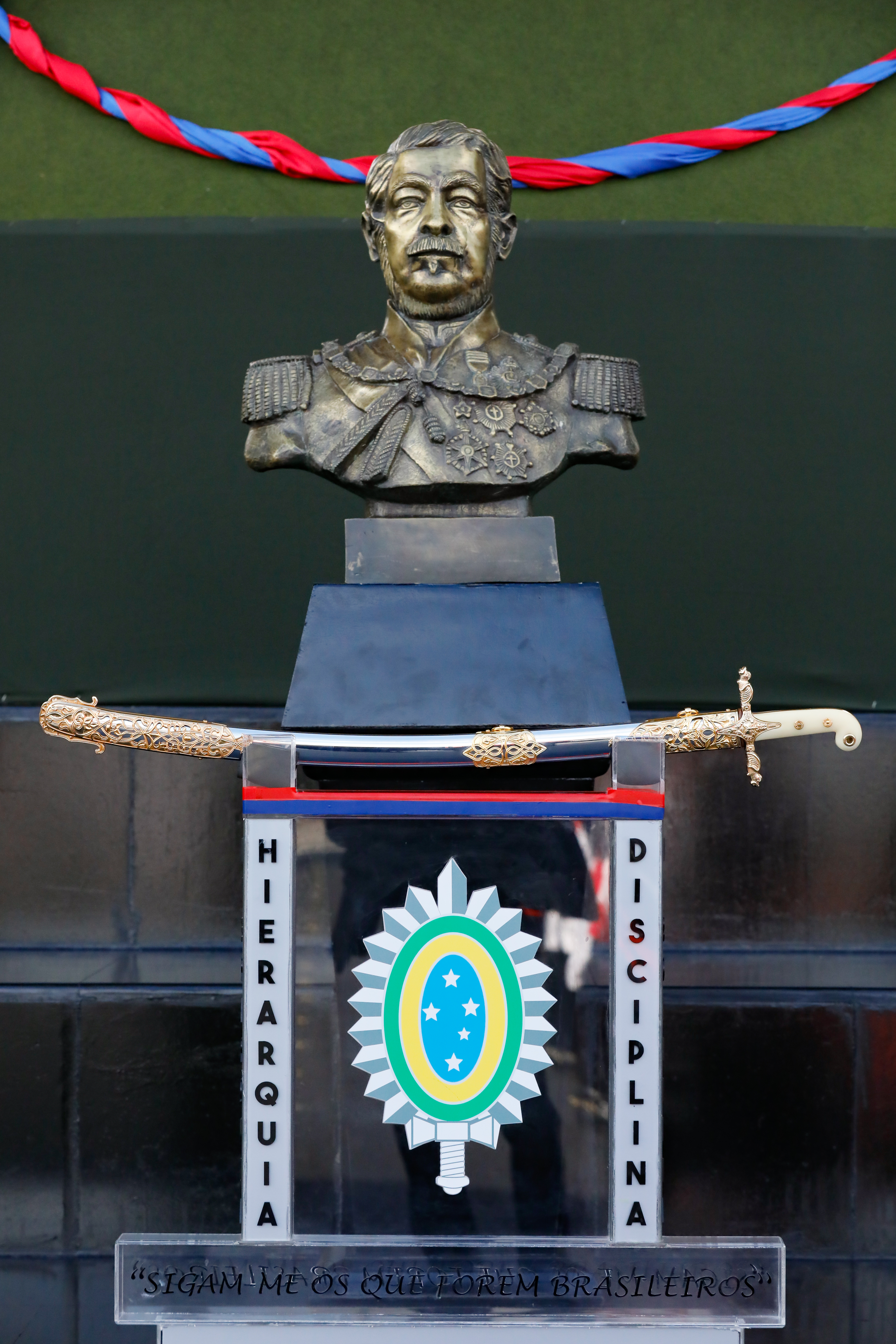
Bust and sword of Caxias on Soldier's Day

Luís Alves de Lima e Silva, the Duke of Caxias, is the "maximum representation of authority, order and tradition for the Brazilian Army". On the centennial of his death, in 1980, Army Minister Walter Pires called him the "personification of the army itself" and a "perfect model of a soldier". Caxias is designated "patron of the army," and his birthday on 25 August is celebrated as "Soldier's Day." The "cult" of Caxias was made official in 1923 and promoted by military authorities as a symbol of a disciplined and loyal soldier. Until then, the main celebration was 24 May, the anniversary of the Battle of Tuyutí, and Caxias was less celebrated than Manuel Luís Osório.

At a level below Caxias, the branches, cadres and services have their own patrons, such as Antônio de Sampaio, patron of the infantry, Villagran Cabrita, patron of engineering, and Emílio Luís Mallet, patron of artillery. Sampaio's birthday, for example, is "Infantry Day". Some specialties and social circles, such as special forces, aviation, and the military family, also have designated patrons. All are historical figures used as examples of attitudes and virtues necessary for military activity. The cult of these figures was consolidated in the 1960s.

The only date with equivalent importance to Soldier's Day is the Army's Day on 19 April, the anniversary of the First Battle of Guararapes. This celebration evokes the belief that the army was born with the Brazilian nation, comprises the "three races that form the essence of the Brazilian people," and defeated a more powerful foreign invader through guerrilla warfare and ambushes. The commemoration of Guararapes can also be associated with the defense of the Amazon and the "resistance strategy".

=== Symbology ===
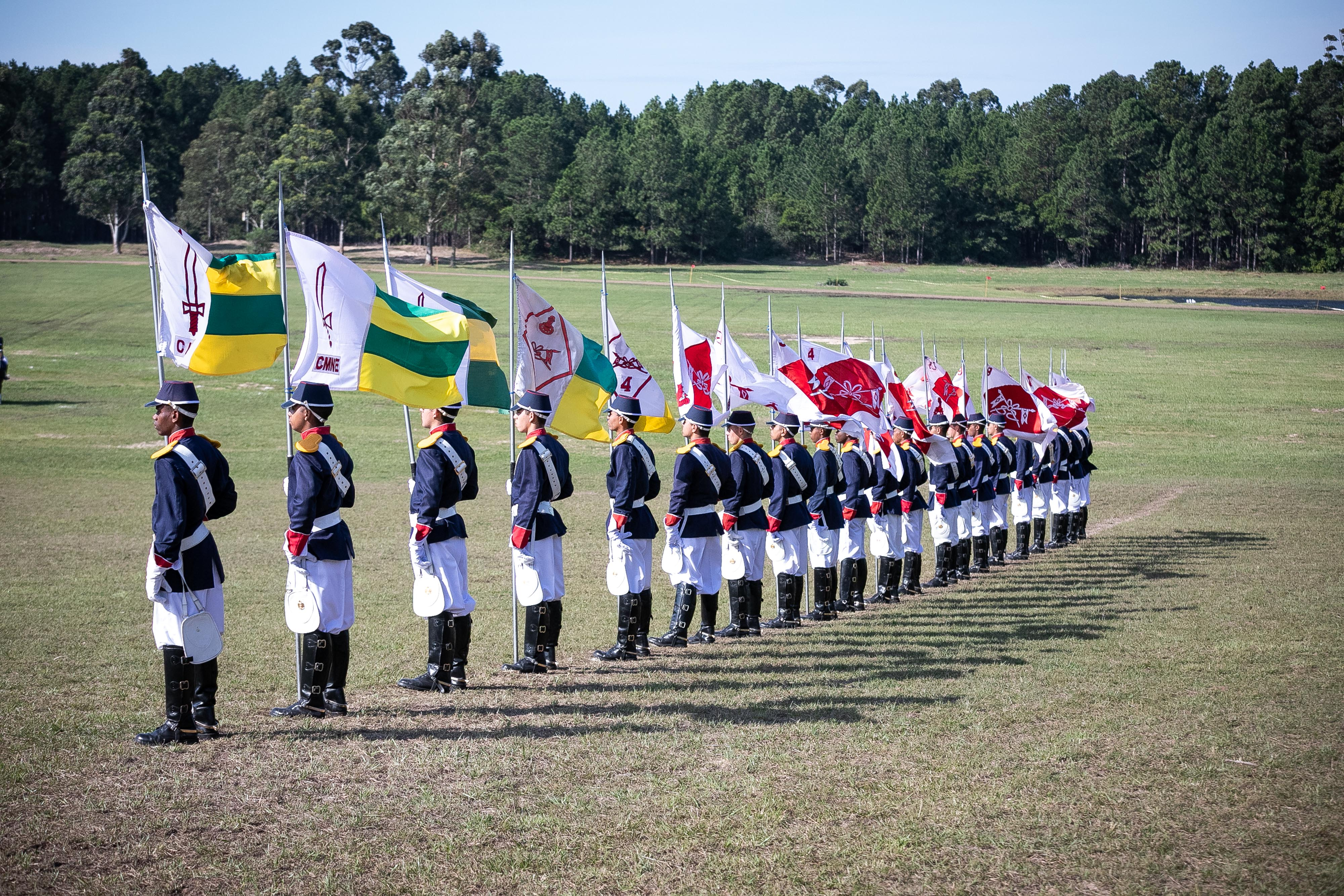
3rd Guard Cavalry Regiment flying the banners of military commands

The Brazilian Army has visual symbols — coats of arms, flags, banners, and pennants — and musical ones — drumbeats, cornets and bugles, songs, shouts, and war choruses. In parades, its dominant musical genre is the dobrado, played by military bands and fanfare bands. (Note: Pedrosa, Fernando Velôzo Gomes (2022). "Bandas, fanfarras, marchas e dobrados militares". Dicionário de história militar do Brasil (1822-2022): volume I. Rio de Janeiro: Autografia. ISBN 978-85-518-4909-5. Music bands have wind, brass, reed, flutes and percussion instruments. The designation of fanfare or band is only formal, as they have the same instruments, just in different proportions. The army does not have a tradition of marching bands, composed only of brass and percussion instruments, as in the Brazilian Marine Corps.) There are hymns and songs of the army, branches, cadres and services, military organizations, and traditional songs. Likewise, specific troops have their own battlecries. The most traditional are "Selva", from the jungle warriors, and "Brasil acima de tudo" ("Brazil above everything"), which originated among paratroopers and later disseminated. (Note: "War cries and choruses are used to awaken the enthusiasm of troops in combat situations, sporting events and in their daily lives. Within units or when several units are gathered, they serve to mark the presence of a certain troop element and create an atmosphere of positive rivalry". "It is common for an army soldier to receive an order and respond "Brazil!" or "Jungle!" or "Steel!". Pedrosa, Fernando Velôzo Gomes (2022). "Gritos e refrões de guerra do Exército Brasileiro". Dicionário de história militar do Brasil (1822-2022): volume I. Rio de Janeiro: Autografia. ISBN 978-85-518-4909-5.) The army's visual identity includes a coat of arms, a banner with the coat of arms and a symbol, the "elliptical cockade" with concentric national colors. It first appeared in uniform regulations in 1951 and has been applied to vehicles since the 1990s, replacing the Southern Cross inscribed in a circle that had been used since World War II.

Some military organizations carry banners, which are their "war flags", and all have badges. Commanders, chiefs, and directors are identified by insignia flags. Branches, cadres, and services have their own heraldic symbols and colors. Organizations with banners have "historical names" referring to dates, places or characters related to the history of the organization or its predecessors, such as the "5th Light Infantry Battalion – Itororó Regiment".

== Organization ==
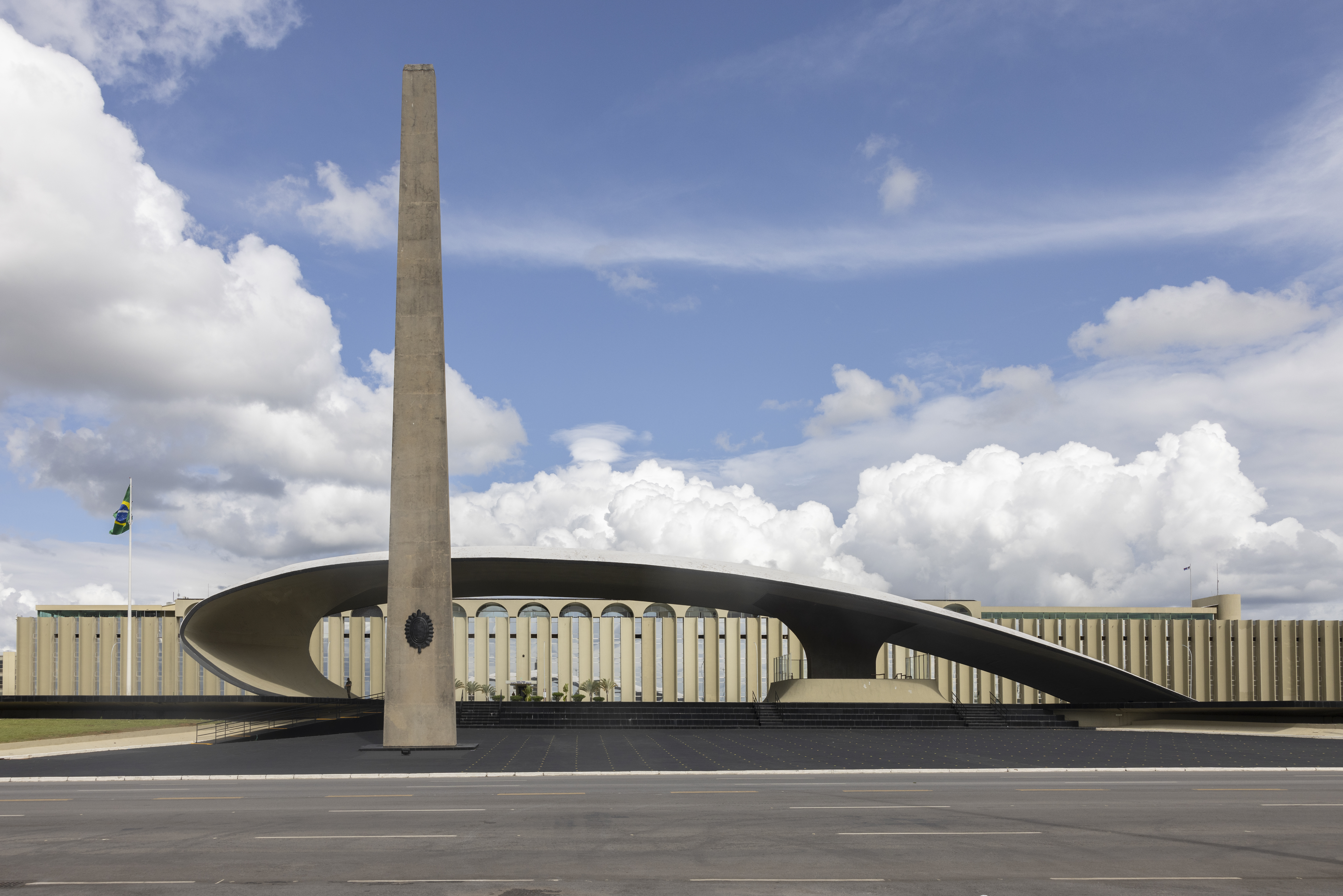
The Brazilian Army Headquarters in Brasília

As part of the Brazilian Armed Forces, the Brazilian Army has its superior direction exercised by the Ministry of Defense and its Supreme Commander is the President of Brazil, who appoints an army commander suggested by the Minister of Defense. The army's structure, complex and well-demarcated territorially, is centered on the Army Command, which has functional autonomy. The Army Headquarters is located in the Urban Military Sector, in Brasília, the capital of Brazil.

The Army Command has a General Management Body, the Army General Staff (Estado-Maior do Exército; EME), four Superior Advisory Bodies, (Note: Army High Command (Alto Comando do Exército; ACE), Superior Council of Economics and Finance (Conselho Superior de Economia e Finanças; CONSEF), Superior Council of Information Technology (Conselho Superior de Tecnologia da Informação; CONTIEx) and the Superior Council for Rationalization and Transformation (Conselho Superior de Racionalização e Transformação; CONSURT).) six Direct and Immediate Assistance Bodies, (Note: Army Commander's Office (Gabinete do Comandante do Exército; Gab Cmt Ex), General Secretariat of the Army (Secretaria-Geral do Exército; SGEx), Army Intelligence Center (Centro de Inteligência do Exército; CIE), Army Social Communication Center (Centro de Comunicação Social do Exército; CComSEx), Army Internal Control Center (Centro de Controle Interno do Exército; CCIEx) and the Join Legal Consultancy of the Army Command (Consultoria Jurídica Adjunta do Comando do Exército; CJACEx).) an Operational Management Body, the Land Operations Command (Comando de Operações Terrestres; COTER), and six Sector Management Bodies (Órgãos de Direção Setorial; ODS). (Note: Logistics Command (Comando Logístico; COLOG), Department of Engineering and Construction (Departamento de Engenharia e Construção; DEC), General Department of Personnel (Departamento-Geral do Pessoal; DGP), Army Department of Education and Culture (Departamento de Educação e Cultura do Exército; DECEx), Department of Science and Technology (Departamento de Ciência e Tecnologia; DCT) and the Secretariat of Economy and Finance (Secretaria de Economia e Finanças; SEF). All bodies are listed in Livro Branco de Defesa Nacional (2020), p. 75.)

The operational arm of the Army is the Land Force. COTER, created to relieve the EME of the executive aspects of operations, evaluates the operational capacity and instruction of the Land Force. The EME formulates military doctrine, strategic planning and general action guidelines. The Army High Command (Alto Comando do Exército; ACE), made up of army generals, is only a superior advisory body, but it was a general management body, coexisting with the EME, until 2006. The Brazilian War Materiel Industry (Indústria de Material Bélico do Brasil; Imbel) is linked to the Army Command.

Several ODS have technical links with Land Force units. The Department of Science and Technology (Departamento de Ciência e Tecnologia; DCT) is also linked to Imbel and has the Army Technological Center (Centro Tecnológico do Exército; CTEx) in its structure, a research body responsible for projects such as the Saber Radar, ALAC and MSS-1.2.

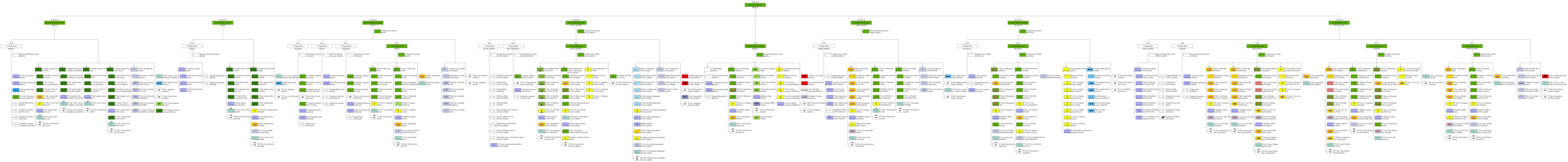
Brazilian Army organization in 2026 (click to enlarge)

=== Commands, divisions and regions ===
The Land Force is made up of eight Military Area Commands, each responsible for a portion of Brazil's territory. When created, the territorial subdivision had a certain similarity to IBGE's 1969 regionalization. Military Area Commands evolved from the four numbered armies and two area commands that existed until 1985. They encompass large operational commands, the Army Divisions (Divisões de Exército; DEs), and large administrative, logistical and territorial commands, the Military Regions (Regiões Militares; RMs). Some RMs command combatant military organizations, but this is not the norm. DEs are brigade coordination commands and do not have a fixed constitution.

Military Area Commands, Army Divisions and Military Regions
Area Commands	Army Divisions	Military Regions	Jurisdiction
Amazon Military Command (Comando Militar da Amazônia; CMA) - Manaus	–	12th - Manaus	
Northern Military Command (Comando Militar do Norte; CMN) - Belém	–	8th - Belém	
Northeastern Military Command (Comando Militar do Nordeste; CMNE) - Recife	7th (Recife)	6th - Salvador	
Northeastern Military Command (Comando Militar do Nordeste; CMNE) - Recife	7th (Recife)	7th - Recife	
Northeastern Military Command (Comando Militar do Nordeste; CMNE) - Recife	7th (Recife)	10th - Fortaleza	
Western Military Command (Comando Militar do Oeste; CMO) - Campo Grande	–	9th - Campo Grande	
Planalto Military Command (Comando Militar do Planalto; CMP) - Brasília	–	11th - Brasília	
Eastern Military Command (Comando Militar do Leste; CML) - Rio de Janeiro	1st (Rio de Janeiro)	1st - Rio de Janeiro	
Eastern Military Command (Comando Militar do Leste; CML) - Rio de Janeiro	1st (Rio de Janeiro)	4th - Belo Horizonte	
Southeastern Military Command (Comando Militar do Sudeste; CMSE) - São Paulo	2nd (São Paulo)	2nd - São Paulo	
Southern Military Command (Comando Militar do Sul; CMS) - Porto Alegre	3rd (Santa Maria) 5th (Curitiba) 6th (Porto Alegre)	3rd - Porto Alegre	
Southern Military Command (Comando Militar do Sul; CMS) - Porto Alegre	3rd (Santa Maria) 5th (Curitiba) 6th (Porto Alegre)	5th - Curitiba	

=== Brigades and units ===
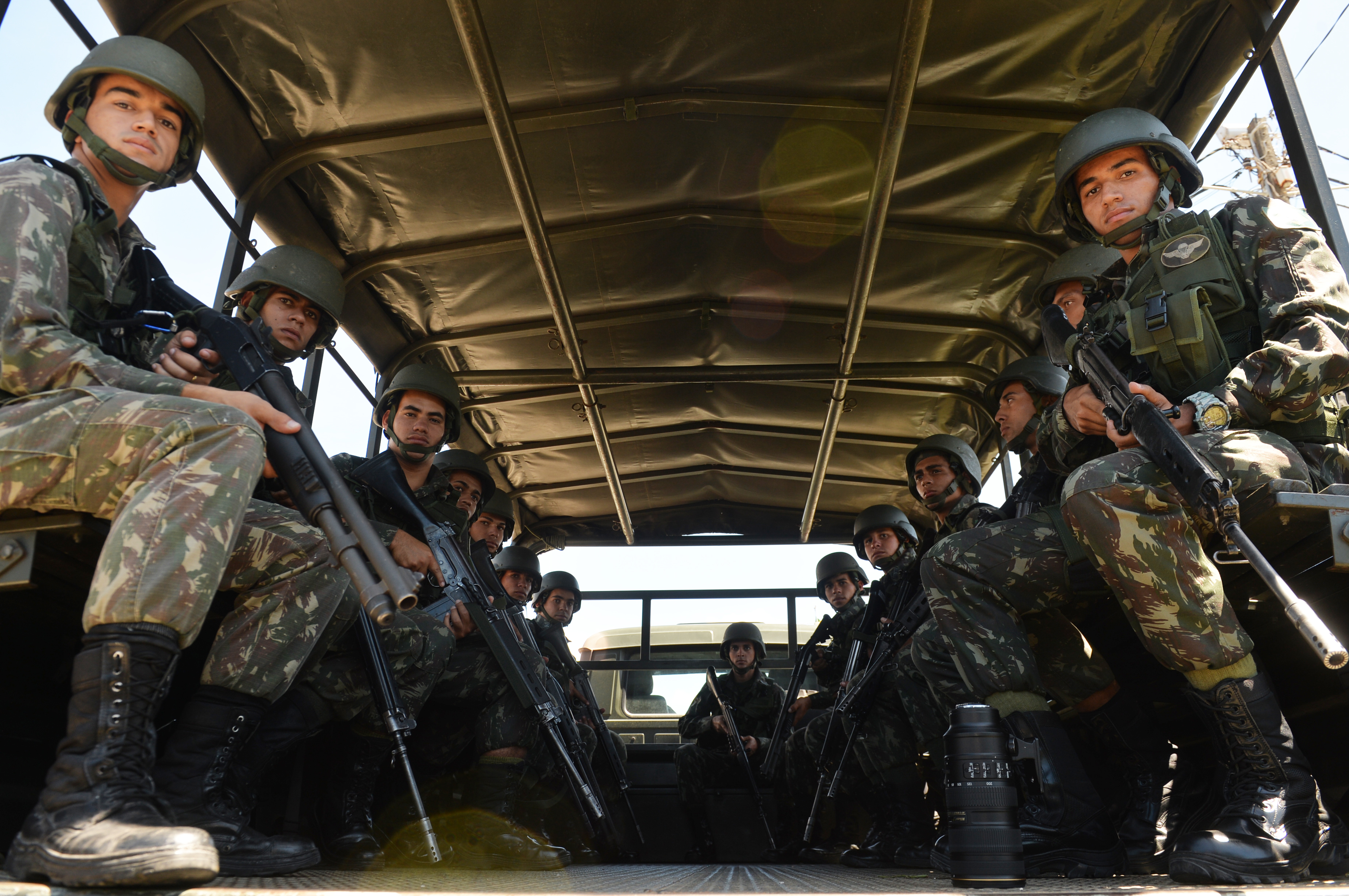
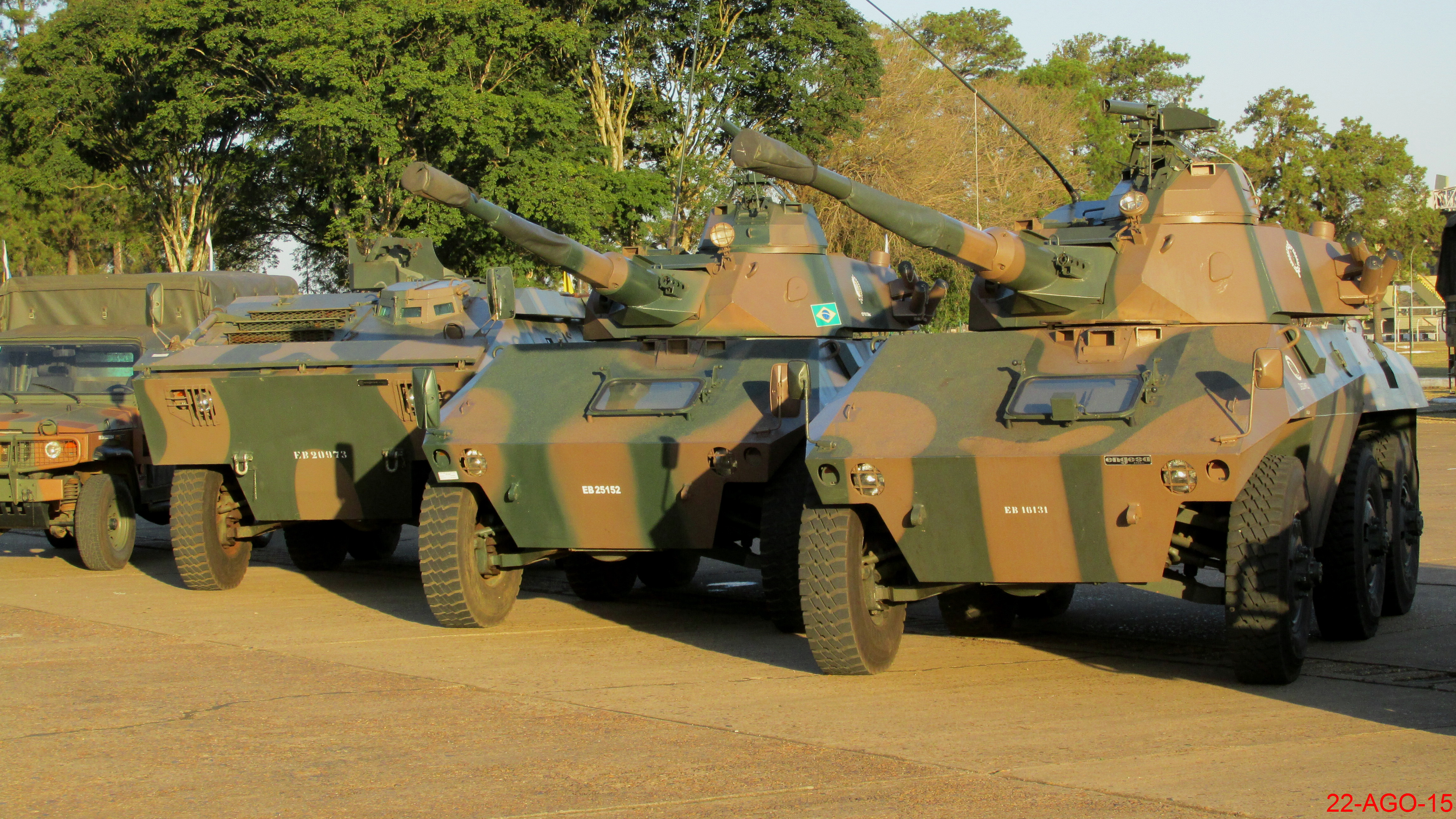

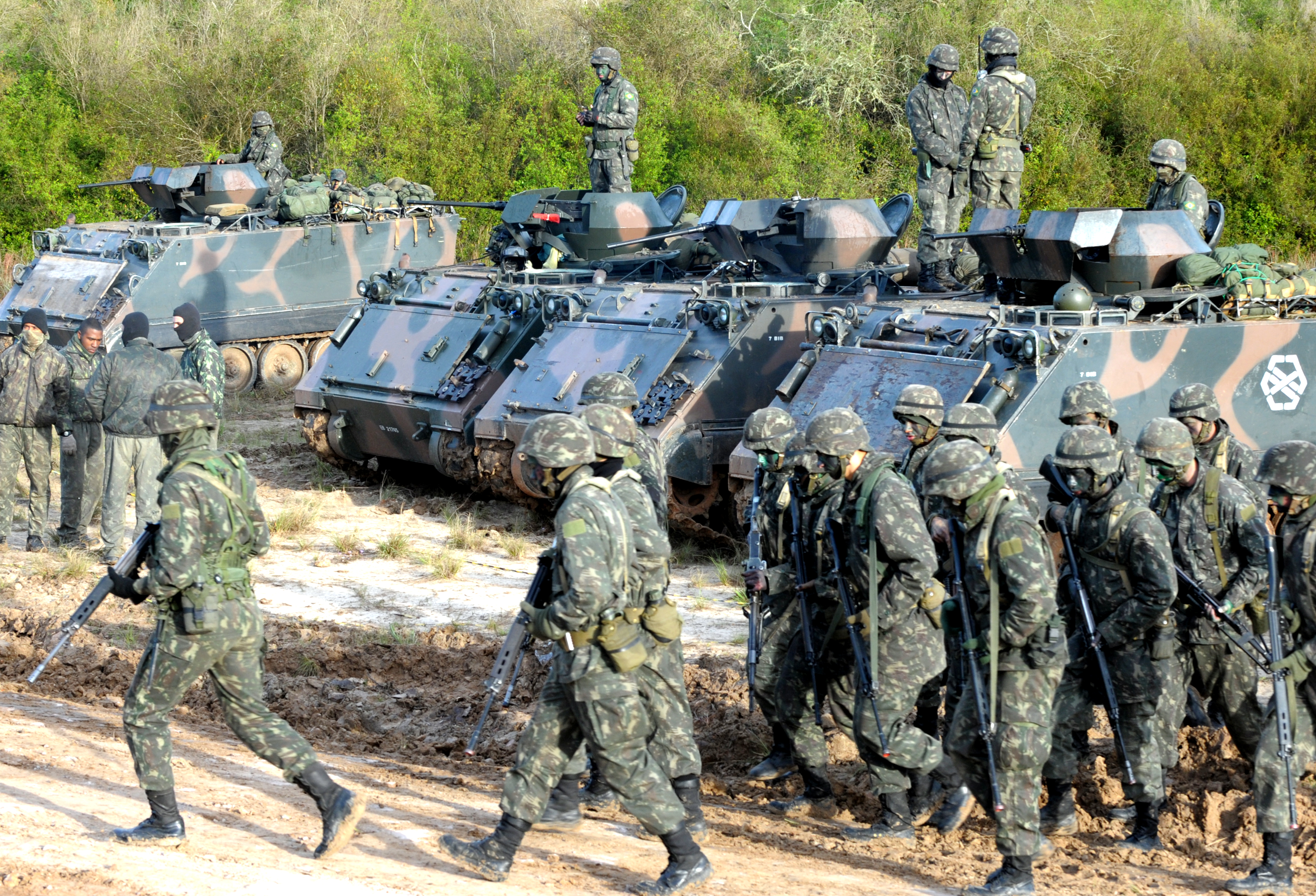
From top to bottom, the 16th Motorized Infantry Battalion, 13th Mechanized Cavalry Regiment and 7th Armored Infantry Battalion

According to the Brazilian Army's doctrine, the brigade is the "basic large unit (Grande Unidade; GU) of combined arms", "with the capacity to act independently and last in action". Its main components are infantry battalions and cavalry regiments, which are supported by command, field artillery, logistics, reconnaissance and security, anti-aircraft artillery, combat engineering, communications, and Army Police elements. Each type of brigade has a fixed formation, but the actual formation may differ from the doctrinal one, and several brigades are incomplete. A brigade's strength can be less than 2,000 soldiers or more than 5,000.

The Armored Cavalry and Armored Infantry brigades are heavy brigades. Their composition is identical, with two tank regiments and two armored infantry battalions as its main components. The Mechanized Cavalry and Mechanized Infantry brigades are medium brigades; a Mechanized Cavalry Brigade has two regiments of mechanized cavalry and one of armored cavalry, (Note: Pedrosa, Modernização e reestruturação do Exército (2018), p. 157. See Brazilian cavalry#Organization.) while the Mechanized Infantry Brigade, with three battalions of mechanized infantry, can be compared to the United States Army's Stryker Brigade Combat Team. The others (Motorized Infantry, Light Infantry, Parachute Infantry, Jungle Infantry and Pantanal Infantry) are light brigades, (Note: Livro Branco de Defesa Nacional (2020), p. 79. The Border Infantry Brigade, mentioned in the book, became the Pantanal Infantry Brigade in 2022.) consisting of three infantry battalions of various types.

Brigades are subordinate to an Army Division or a Military Area Command. In an equivalent situation, there are Divisional Artillery, Engineering Groups and commands for specific use: Aviation, Special Operations, Anti-Air Defense, Artillery, Communications and Electronic Warfare and Cyber Defense.

Battalions (in infantry, engineering and communications), regiments (in cavalry), groups (in artillery), parks (in Ordnance) and depots (in the Quartermaster Service) are called "units", consisting of a single branch and commanded by a colonel or lieutenant colonel. In combat branches, units have 500 to 900 soldiers. These include "subunits": companies (in infantry, engineering or communications), squadrons (in cavalry), batteries (in artillery) and flights (in aviation). Some subunits are independent, with their own administration.

=== Geographic distribution ===
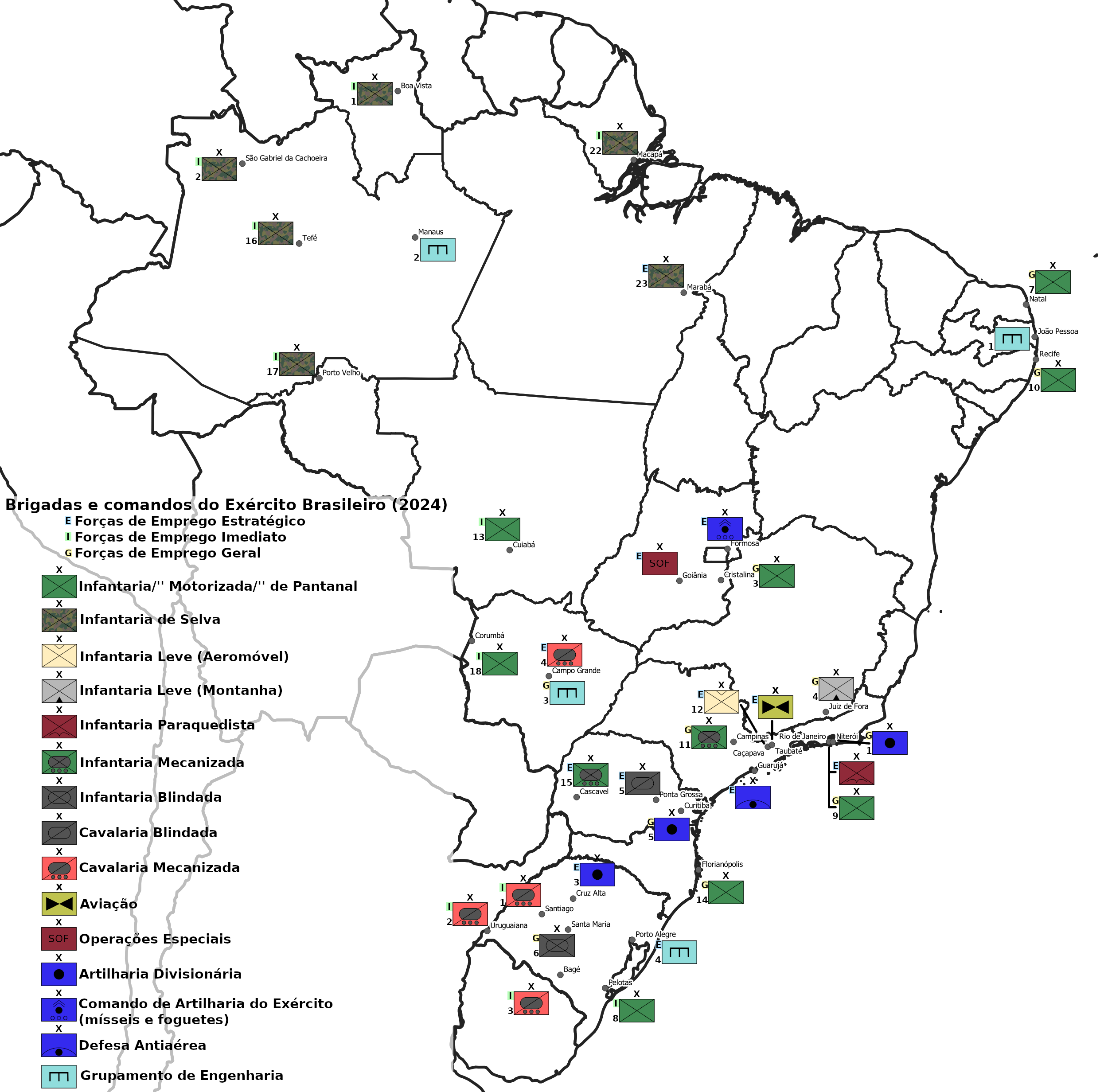
Location of brigades in 2024 and their respective employment groups

The distribution of troops across Brazil's territory follows strategy and keeps remnants of past guidelines. The country is widely dotted with barracks, even on the most remote frontiers. Construction engineering battalions work on various road and rail routes. Throughout history, each reorganization and increase in personnel filled more spaces, as recommended by the "Presence Strategy". This differs, for example, from the Chilean Army, which has become compact and mobile since the 1990s. Still, the Brazilian Army has strategic reaction forces in the "central core" of the country, between São Paulo, Rio de Janeiro and Brasília, from where they can access any other region.

The greatest concentration of troops is in the Center-South, despite the priority given to the Amazon's defense. The centers of political (Federal District) and economic power (São Paulo and Rio de Janeiro) and some border states (Rio Grande do Sul, Paraná, Mato Grosso do Sul and Amazonas) have greater numbers of combat, logistics and administrative support units. Historically, the most politically important garrison was that of Rio de Janeiro, as the country's capital was there until 1960; furthermore, the main military schools are in that state. The other historical area of troop concentration is in the South, targeting the border with Argentina, Brazil's traditional rival on the continent. Rio de Janeiro lost several brigades from the 1990s onwards, while the Southern Military Command maintained its primacy. In 2011, it commanded 90% of the army's armor, 100% of its self-propelled artillery, 75% of its engineering units and 75% of its mechanized cavalry.

=== Employment groups and Readiness Forces ===
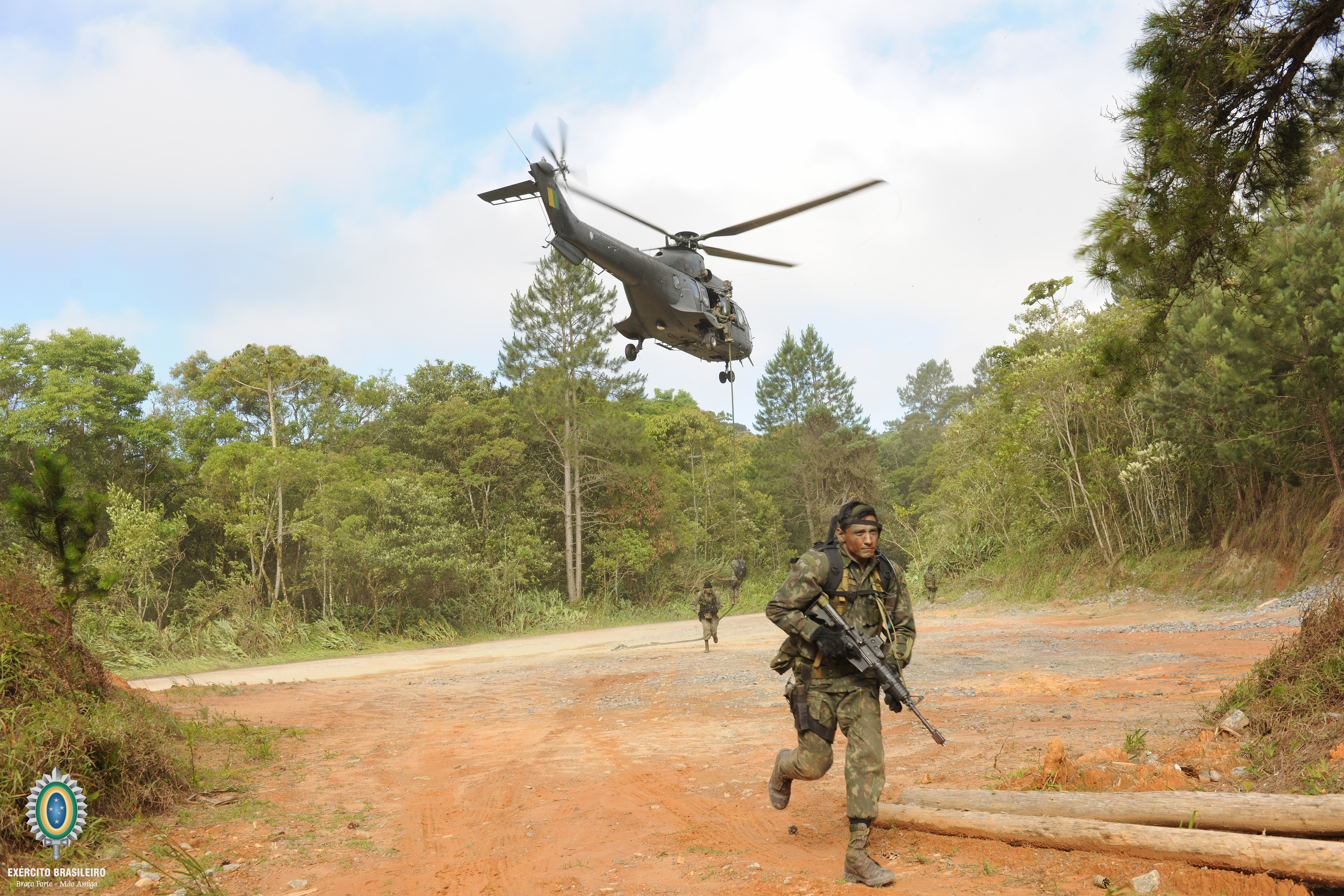
Specialized strategic employment forces (Aviation Command and Special Operations Command)

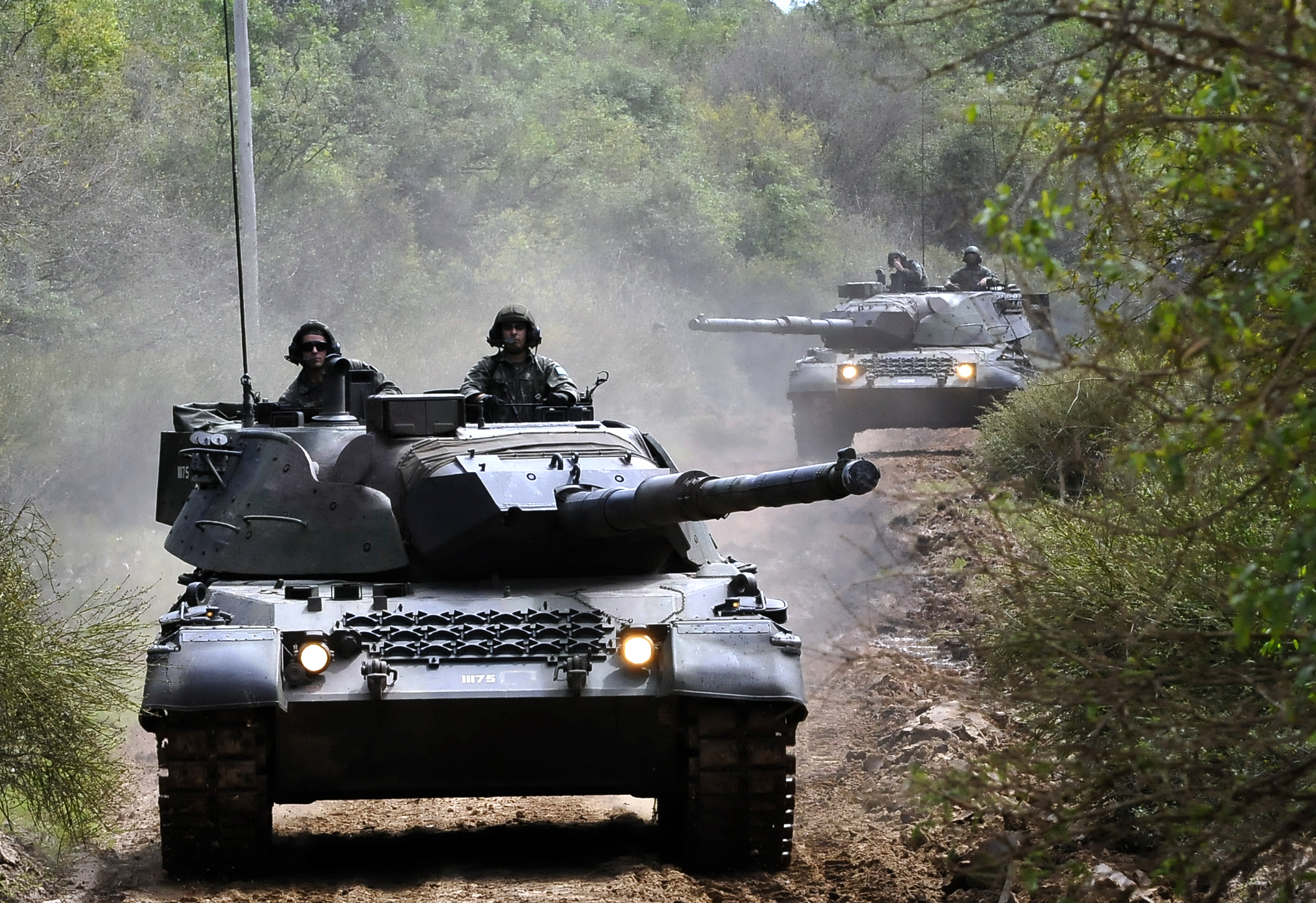
General employment force (6th Armored Infantry Brigade)

The Land Force is divided into three "employment groups": the General Employment Forces, which reinforce the others, the Immediate Employment Forces, which operate along the border, and the Strategic Employment Forces, which can move anywhere in the country and are "forces with combat power that enable, in situations of crisis/armed conflict, strategic imbalance, through deterrent and offensive strategies". There are also support modules and Specialized Strategic Employment Forces. In the distribution of materiel and personnel, priority belongs to the Strategic Deployment Forces and some General Deployment ones.

The employment groups were defined in 2017 (Note: Soares, Estudo comparativo de modelos de Forças de Prontidão (2021), p. 59. The Army's Strategic Conception of 2017 had only two groups, the strategic deployment and general deployment forces, in addition to the specialized modules.) and replace older categorizations, such as the "Strategic Action Forces" and, before them, the "Strategic Rapid Action Forces" (Forças de Ação Rápida Estratégica; FAR Estrt), understood as the strategic reserve of the army, highly mobile and fully trained. A number of companies and battalions were designated as regional FAR. The other forces, known as "Operational Military Organizations", would have greater shortages of personnel and materiel, and would be mainly responsible for forming the reserve. Until the 1990s, the Parachute Infantry Brigade was the only strategic ready-deployment force.

The Strategic Employment Forces, Specialized Strategic Employment Forces, priority General Deployment Forces and support modules make up the Readiness Forces (Forças de Prontidão; FORPRON), which maintain a rotation of professional personnel. FORPRON are made up of unit-sized forces (Note: "FORPRON are made up of elements from the entire brigade responsible for preparation, given that none of the base units have full readiness capacity, due to restrictions in their personnel, materiel, ammunition and supplies". Araújo, Luiz Cláudio Ferreira de (2022). Prontidão de forças: do nível tático ao estratégico (PDF) (Policy Paper thesis). Escola de Comando e Estado-Maior do Exército. p. 17.) provided by each of the brigades, with a total strength of 9,150 soldiers in 2023. (Note: Relatório de Gestão do Comando do Exército (2023), p. 81. The participating brigades were the Parachute Infantry Brigade, 4th Mechanized Cavalry Brigade, 5th Armored Cavalry Brigade, 23rd Jungle Infantry Brigade, 15th Mechanized Infantry Brigade, 12th Light Infantry Brigade (Airmobile), 1st Jungle Infantry Brigade, 10th Motorized Infantry Brigade, 6th Armored Infantry Brigade and the 9th Motorized Infantry Brigade.) The Brazilian Army plans to have, in total, a division made up of two brigades from the FORPRON. From the FORPRON, the army can select an expeditionary force or peacekeeping force to send abroad.

=== Specialized components ===
==== Special Operations ====
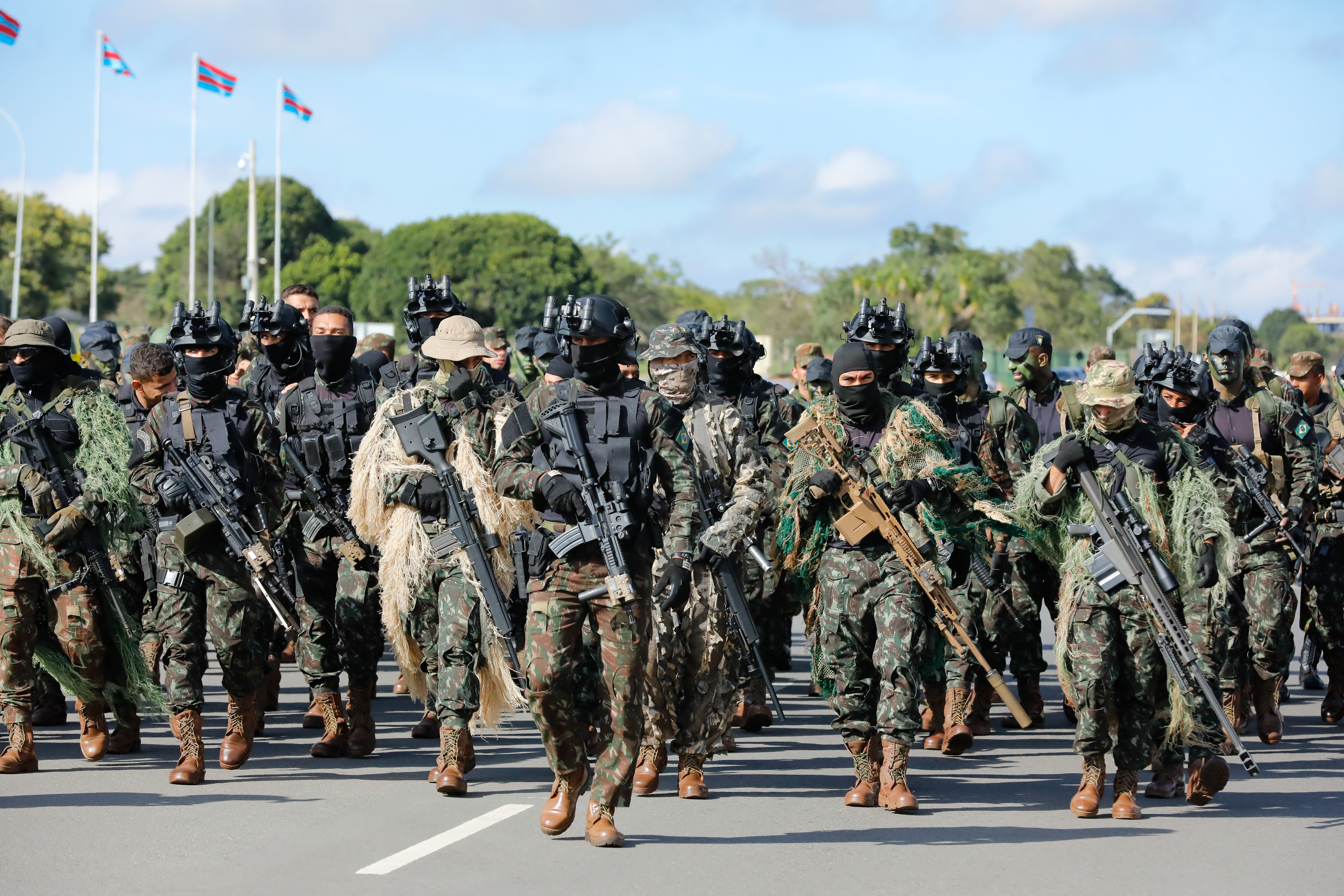
Special Operations soldiers

The army's special operations involve "highly specialized training of the combatant, the use of unconventional weapons and equipment, missions with high political sensitivity, the heterodox application of the principles of war, and the exploitation of limited opportunities", in irregular warfare missions, direct action, strategic reconnaissance, counterinsurgency warfare, counterterrorism, psychological operations, search and rescue, and humanitarian assistance. Forces with these missions are part of the Special Operations Command (Comando de Operações Especiais; C Op Esp), based in Goiânia and subordinate to the Planalto Military Command, with preparation and employment links to COTER. The exception is the 3rd Special Forces Company (Force 3), in Manaus, which is subordinate to the Amazon Military Command, but linked to C Op Esp.

Its main units are the 1st Commando Actions Battalion (1.º Batalhão de Ações de Comandos; BAC) and the 1st Special Forces Battalion (1.º Batalhão de Forças Especiais; 1st BFEsp); both are elite units and difficult to join. (Note: Viana, História institucional e cultura organizacional da tropa aeroterrestre (2020), p. 260. See also Silva, Angela Maria Monteiro (2015). "Curso de Ações de Comandos: estressores, níveis de estresse e representações pictóricas". Revista Naval Psicologia em Destaque. 3 (3). Serviço de Seleção do Pessoal da Marinha. and Stochero, Tahiane (2011-02-12). "Militares relatam o rigor dos cursos para integrar as tropas de elite". G1..) The training of 1st BFEsp personnel, also called "FEs" or "ghosts", is comparable to the American Special Forces and includes long patrols in the Amazon jungle and urban crime fighting strategies.

==== By terrain ====
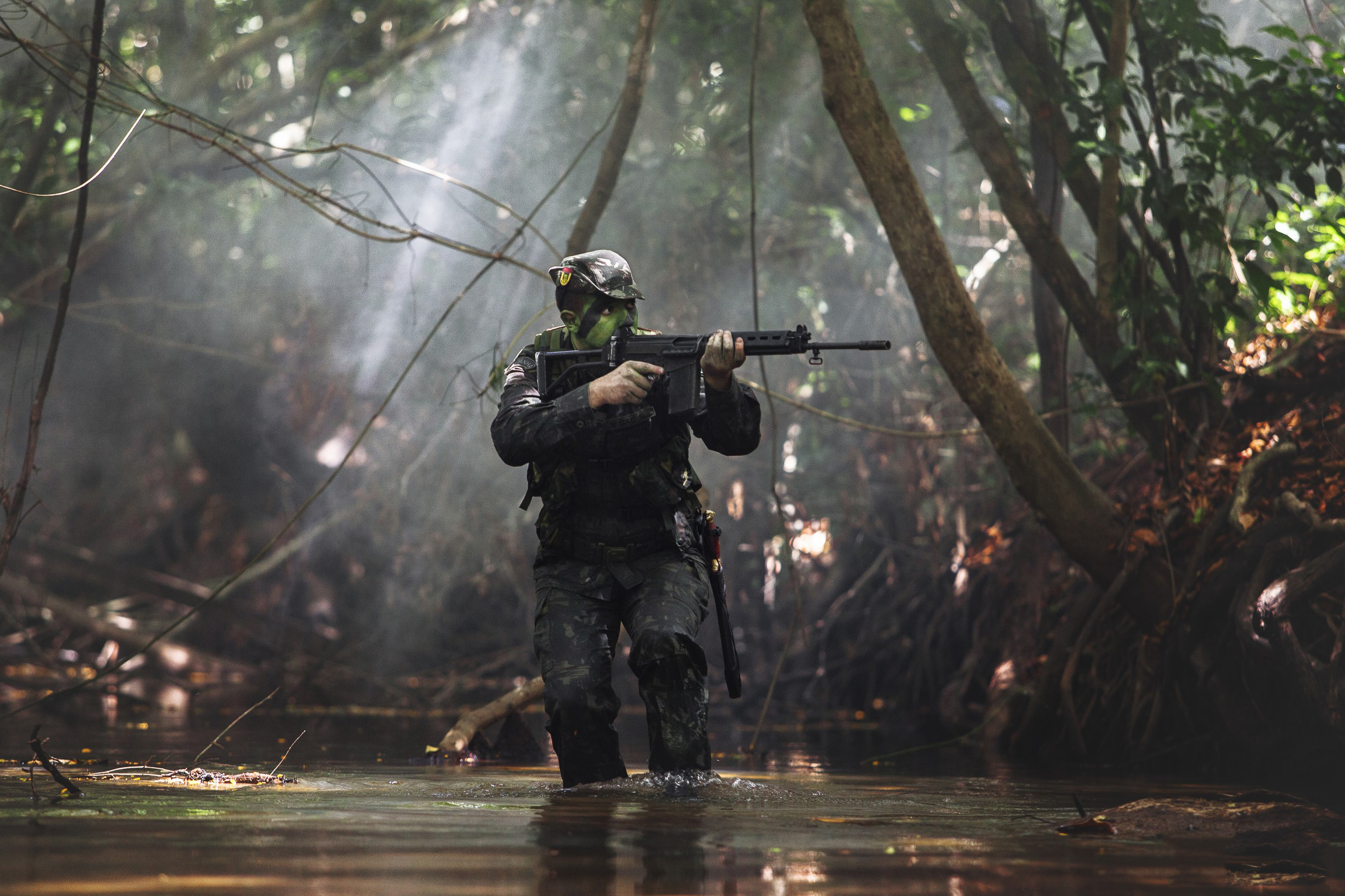
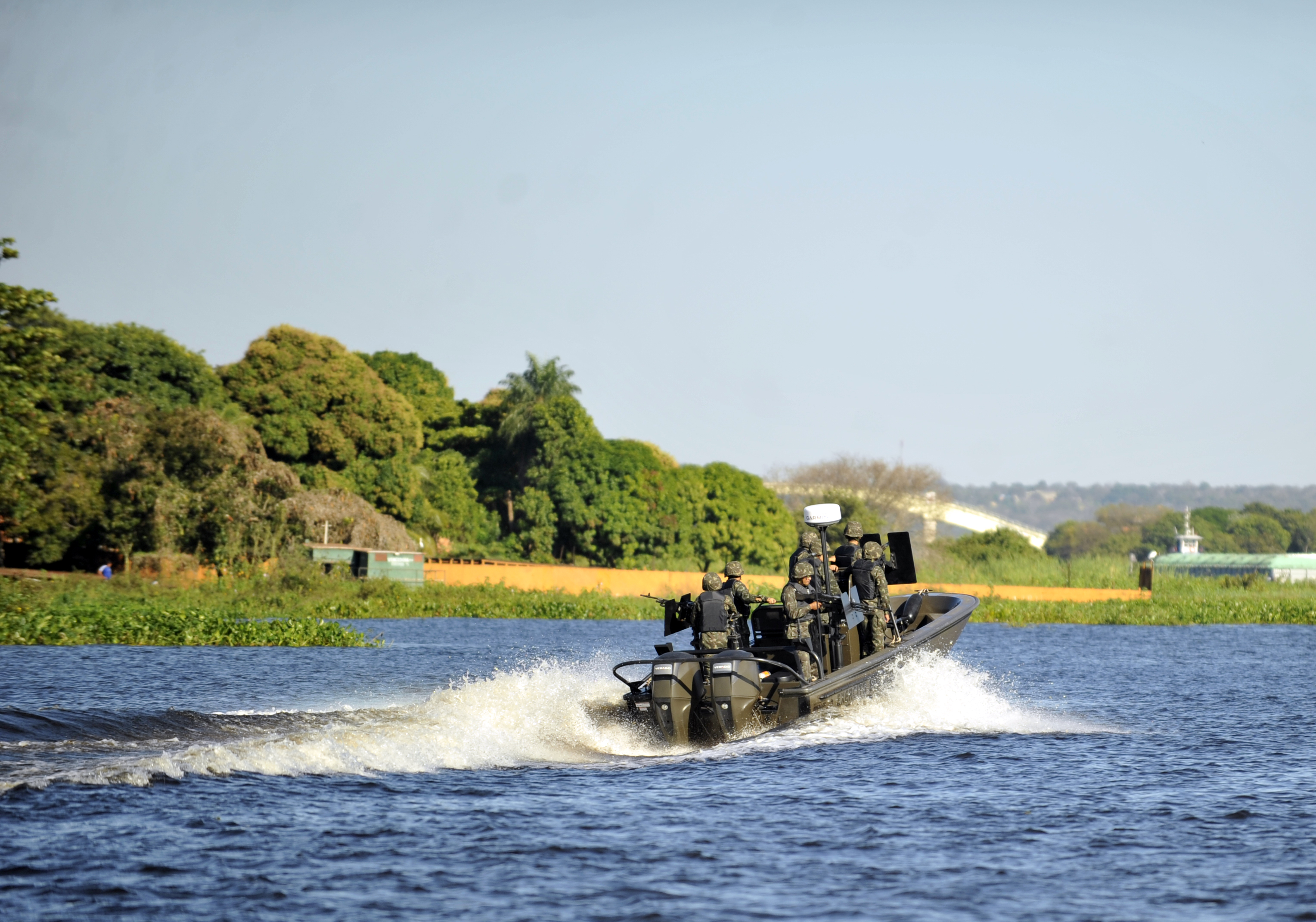

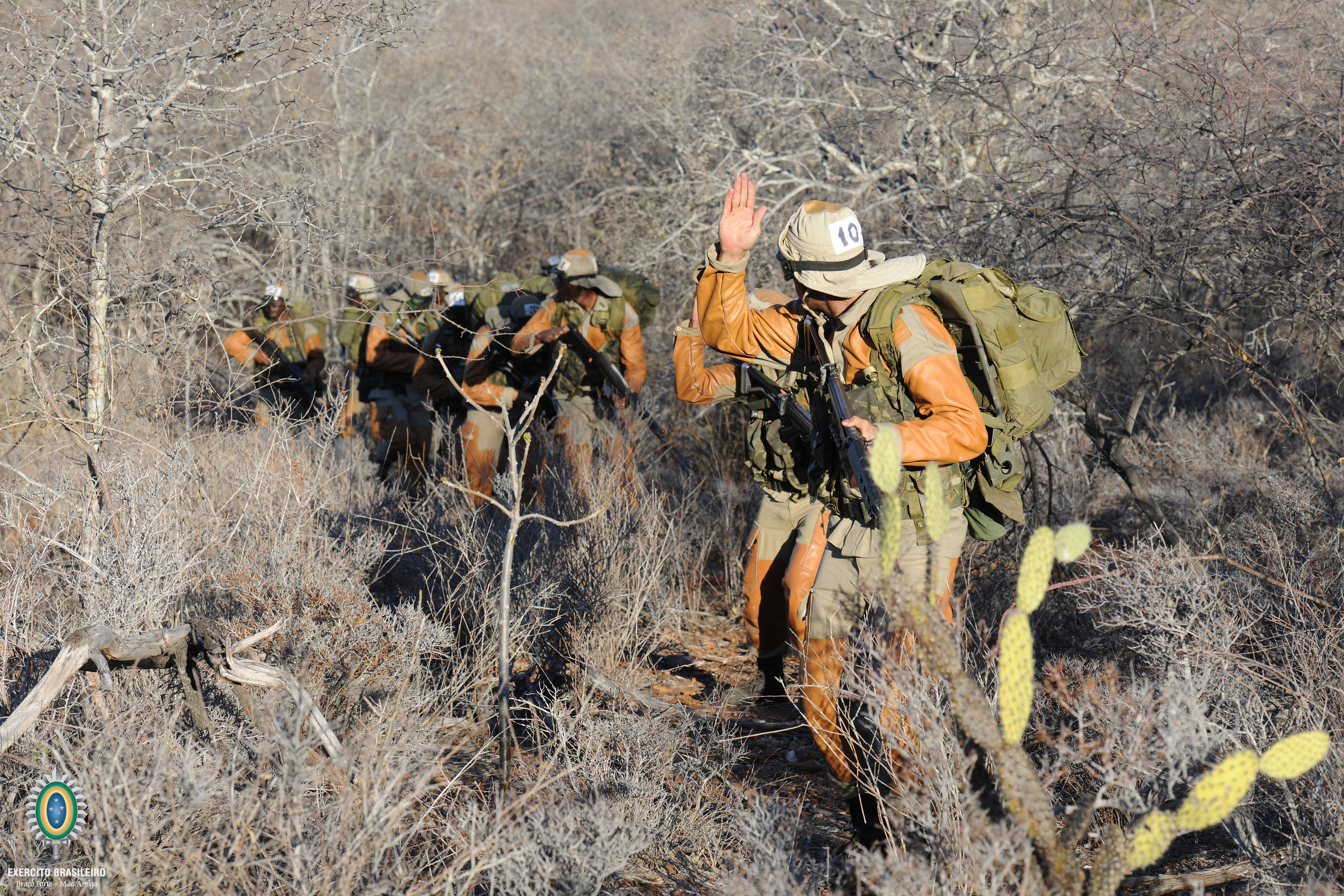
From top to bottom: the jungle infantry, 17th Border Battalion and 72nd Caatinga Infantry Battalion

Present in all biomes of Brazil, the army has specialized troops for mountain, Pantanal, caatinga, jungle (which, in the army's context refers to the Amazon), and urban environments. Specialization courses and internships in these environments are carried out in some battalions or in instruction centers.

Jungle training largely occurs in military organizations in the Amazon, but there is a specialized training center, the Jungle Warfare Instruction Center (Centro de Instrução de Guerra na Selva; CIGS), in Manaus. With extreme physical and mental demands, it is highly competitive and internationally renowned. The Brazilian jungle infantry is characterized by survival in a hostile environment, decentralized fractions, river and air movements and flanking maneuvers. Brazilian army theorists recognize that the country would not resist an invasion of the Amazon by a superior military force through conventional means. Inspired by the Vietnam War and their experience in Araguaia, they propose guerrilla warfare to wear down the invader's will, in the so-called "Resistance Strategy".

These specialized forces comprise the six Jungle Infantry Brigades deployed in the Amazon: the 1st in Boa Vista, 2nd in São Gabriel da Cachoeira, 16th in Tefé, 17th in Porto Velho, 22nd in Macapá and 23rd in Marabá. Some of its Jungle Infantry Battalions (Batalhões de Infantaria de Selva; BIS) are designated "Frontier Commands", encompassing Special Border Companies and Platoons (Companhias Especiais de Fronteira; CEF, and Pelotões Especiais de Fronteira; PEF); although essential in surveillance, these platoons have very limited military power. Recruits at border posts are largely local indigenous people, but there are tensions with the local population.

Military mountaineering instruction takes place at the 4th Light Mountain Infantry Brigade, in Juiz de Fora, and does not include snow operations, as in mountain environments in other countries. Internships in Pantanal operations take place at the 17th Border Battalion, in Corumbá. Employing waterway and air transport, it continuously patrols the border and is subordinate to the 18th Pantanal Infantry Brigade.

The Caatinga Operations Instruction Center (Centro de Instrução de Operações na Caatinga; CIOpC) is part of the 72nd Caatinga Infantry Battalion, (Note: Known as the 72nd Motorized Infantry Battalion until 4 January 2023.) in Petrolina, Pernambuco. Caatinga fighters are distinguished by their reinforced leather uniforms, to protect themselves from thorny vegetation. The Urban Operations Instruction Center is part of the 28th Mechanized Infantry Battalion, in Campinas.

==== By air transport ====
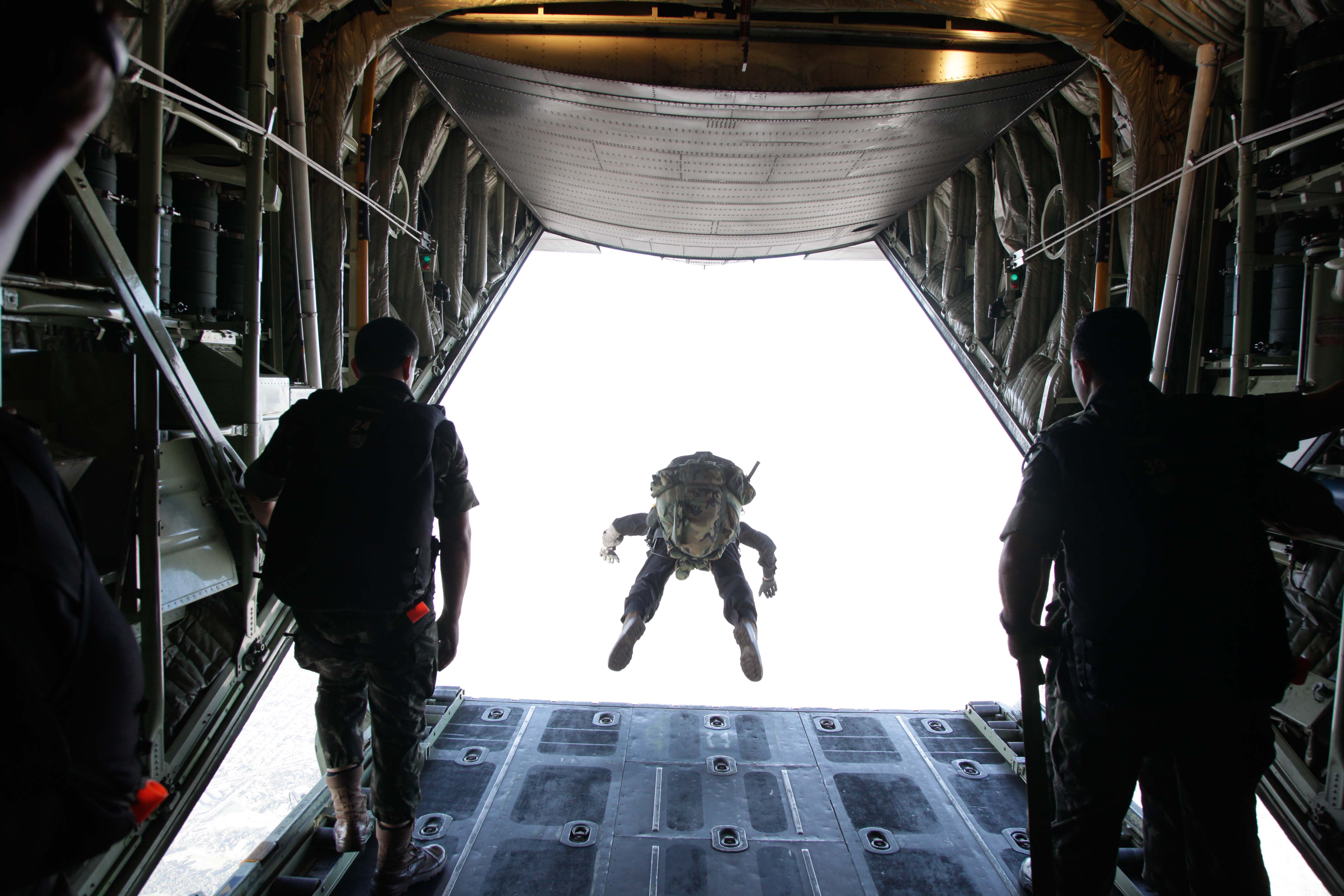
Parachute jump

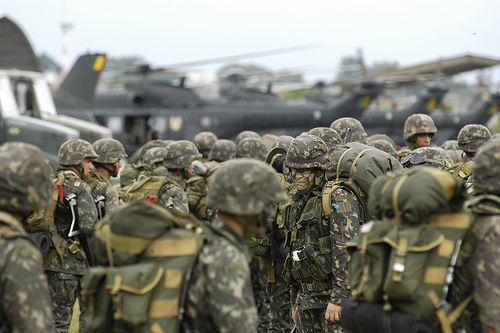
Airmobile infantry with Army Aviation

The Parachute Infantry Brigade and the 12th Light Infantry Brigade (Airmobile) are the two brigades listed by the IISS in the "aerial maneuver" category, that is, trained and equipped to reach the battlefield by transport aircraft and/or helicopters. Outside the brigades there is another airmobile unit, the 1st Jungle Infantry Battalion, in Manaus. Mountain infantry, as it is also light infantry, may be airlifted.

The airmobile brigade specializes in helitransport operations (along with Army Aviation), but as it is light in equipment and weapons, it can also be transported in air force planes or civilian vehicles such as vans, buses, trucks, trains and ships. Its operational concept is focused on infiltration, extraction and airmobile assault behind enemy lines, employing Army Aviation helicopters. Subordinated to the 2nd Army Division, the brigade is headquartered in Caçapava, São Paulo, in the Rio-São Paulo axis region, where it is close to the Army Aviation Command. Army Aviation has two battalions in Taubaté, one in Campo Grande, one in Manaus and a detachment in Belém.

The parachute brigade, in turn, is focused on airborne assault, although it has never carried out a mass parachute jump outside of exercises and maneuvers. Its great usefulness lies in the immediate transport of its troops, and its recent employment situations tend to be in an urban environment. Its official mission is to "move quickly [...] by airlift or airdrop", arriving within 48 hours at any point in Brazil. Paratroopers are considered an elite troop within the army and a "showcase" of the institution.

The brigade receives many more volunteers than it has vacancies, it is more rigorous in selection and cultivates a "paratrooper mystique" and its own identity and values. Some traditions visually distinguish paratroopers, such as brown combat boots, red berets and silver wings chevrons. Headquartered in Rio de Janeiro, the brigade is subordinate to the Land Operations Command and the Eastern Military Command.

==== Chemical, Biological, Radiological and Nuclear Defense ====
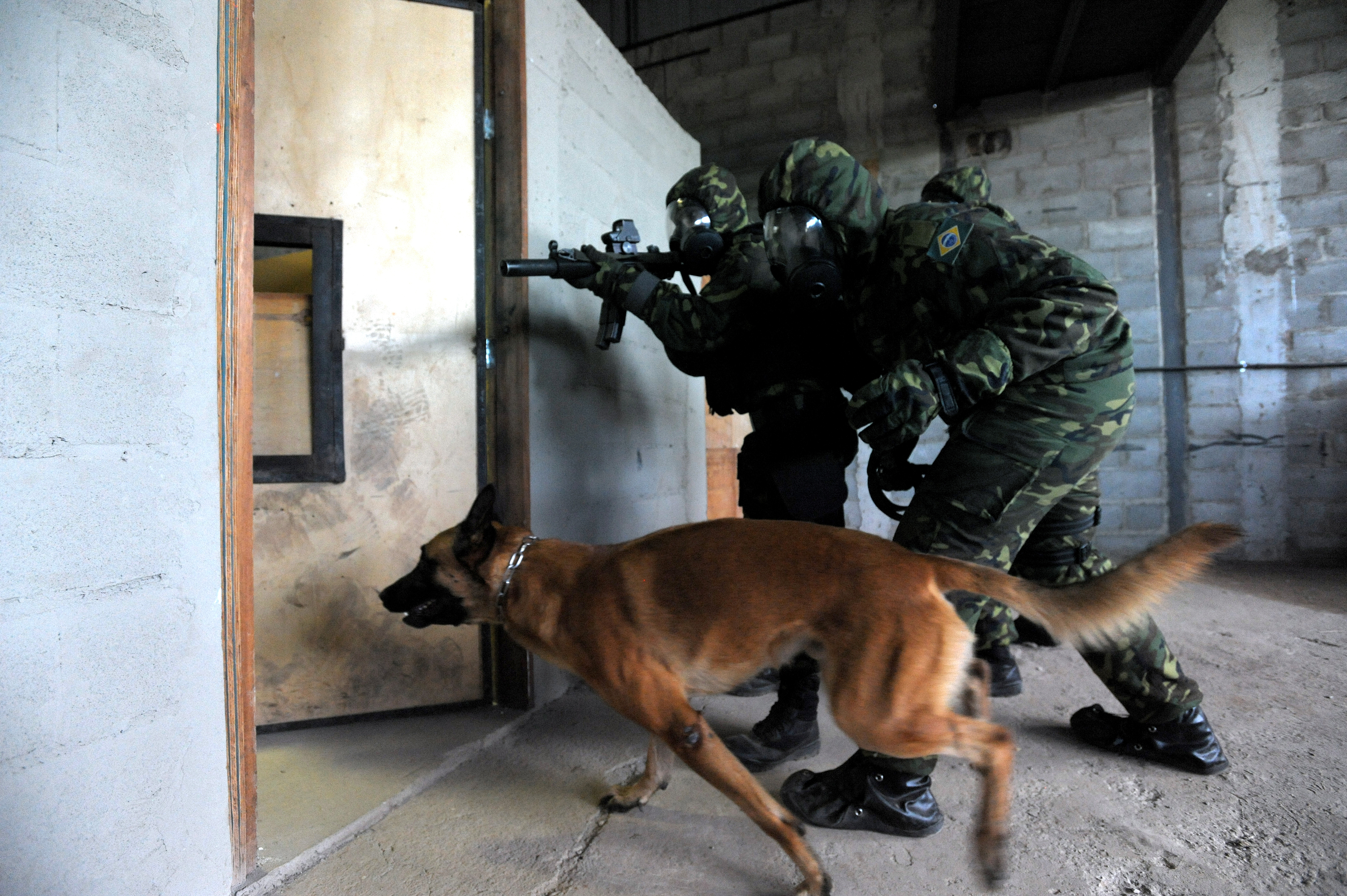
DQBRN soldiers in counterterrorism training

Chemical, Biological, Radiological and Nuclear defense (Defesa Química, Biológica, Radiológica e Nuclear; DQBRN) is carried out by the 1st DBQRN Battalion (subordinated to the Eastern Military Command), the DQBRN Company (subordinated to the Special Operations Command), the School of Specialized Instruction and the DQBRN Institute of the Army's Technological Center, in coordination with its counterparts in the Armed Forces, the National Nuclear Energy Commission and international organizations such as the International Atomic Energy Agency and the Organization for the Prohibition of Chemical Weapons. They can be used in response to accidents (their first real use was in the Goiânia accident in 1987), terrorist attacks and in a war environment, to recover forces attacked by such weapons of mass destruction. To this end, they perform the recognition, identification and decontamination of QBRN threats.

==== Army Police ====
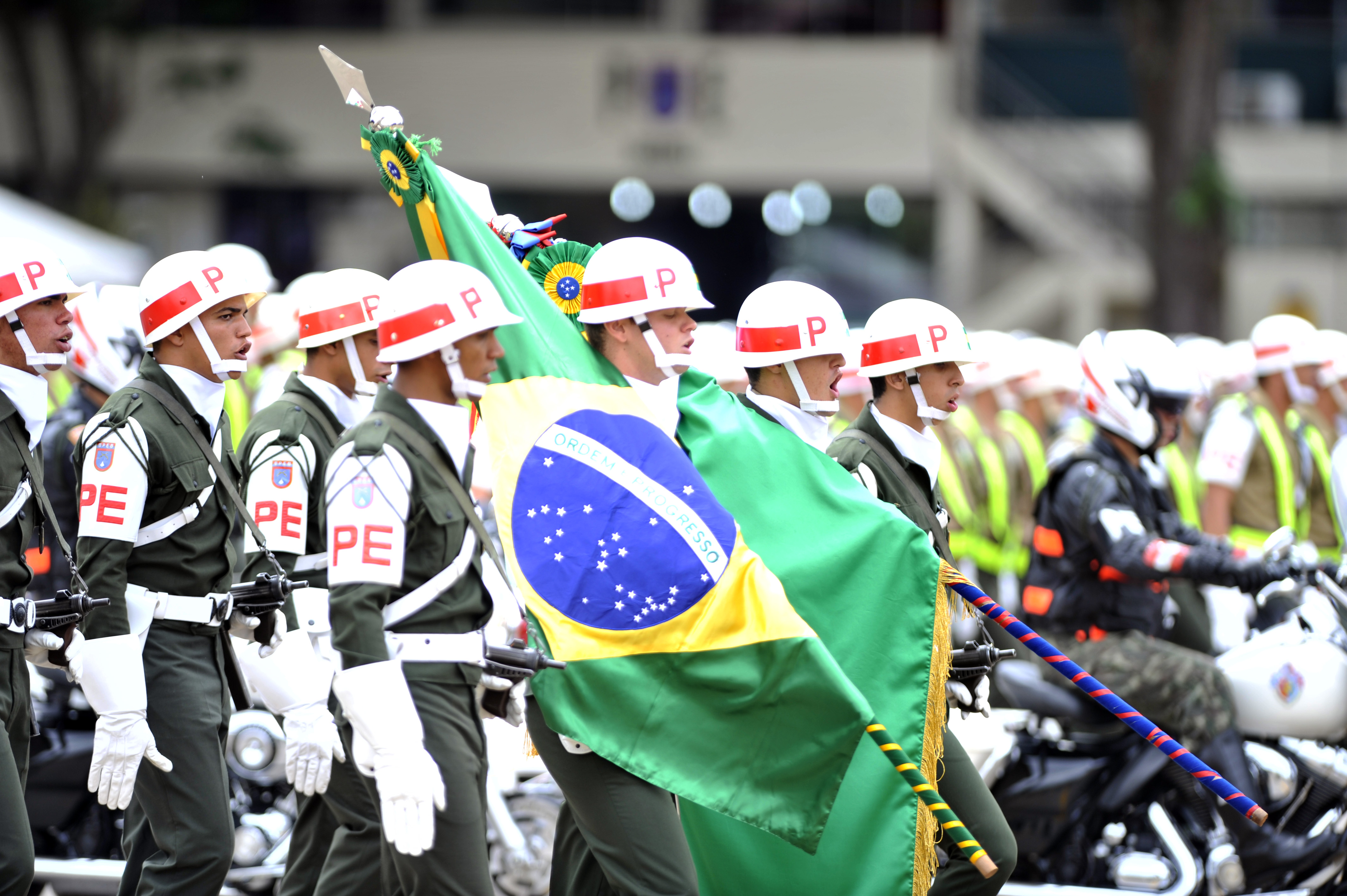
Army police parade

The Army Police (Polícia do Exército; PE) is, in the generic sense, the military police of the Brazilian Army, and should not be confused with the state police forces (Polícias Militares). (Note: In Brazil, Military Police can refer either to the police of the nation's Armed Forces (...) or to the ostensible police of Brazilian federative units, the police responsible for preserving public order (Military Police of the States and the Federal District).) Its soldiers are identified by an armband with the letters "PE". It is a specialized infantry troop available at each level of command: Military Area Commands have PE battalions, divisions have companies and brigades have platoons. The PE monitors troop discipline, prevents and investigates crime, provides security for authorities, guards prisoners and patrols facilities, among other duties. It is used both in conventional military operations and in combating crime. Current PE doctrine recognizes broad and hybrid action in "humanized terrains (urban or rural)", in which there are "actors acting in spaces that go beyond the battlefield" and multiple dimensions — physical, human and informational — of the operational environment.

==== Guard infantry and cavalry ====
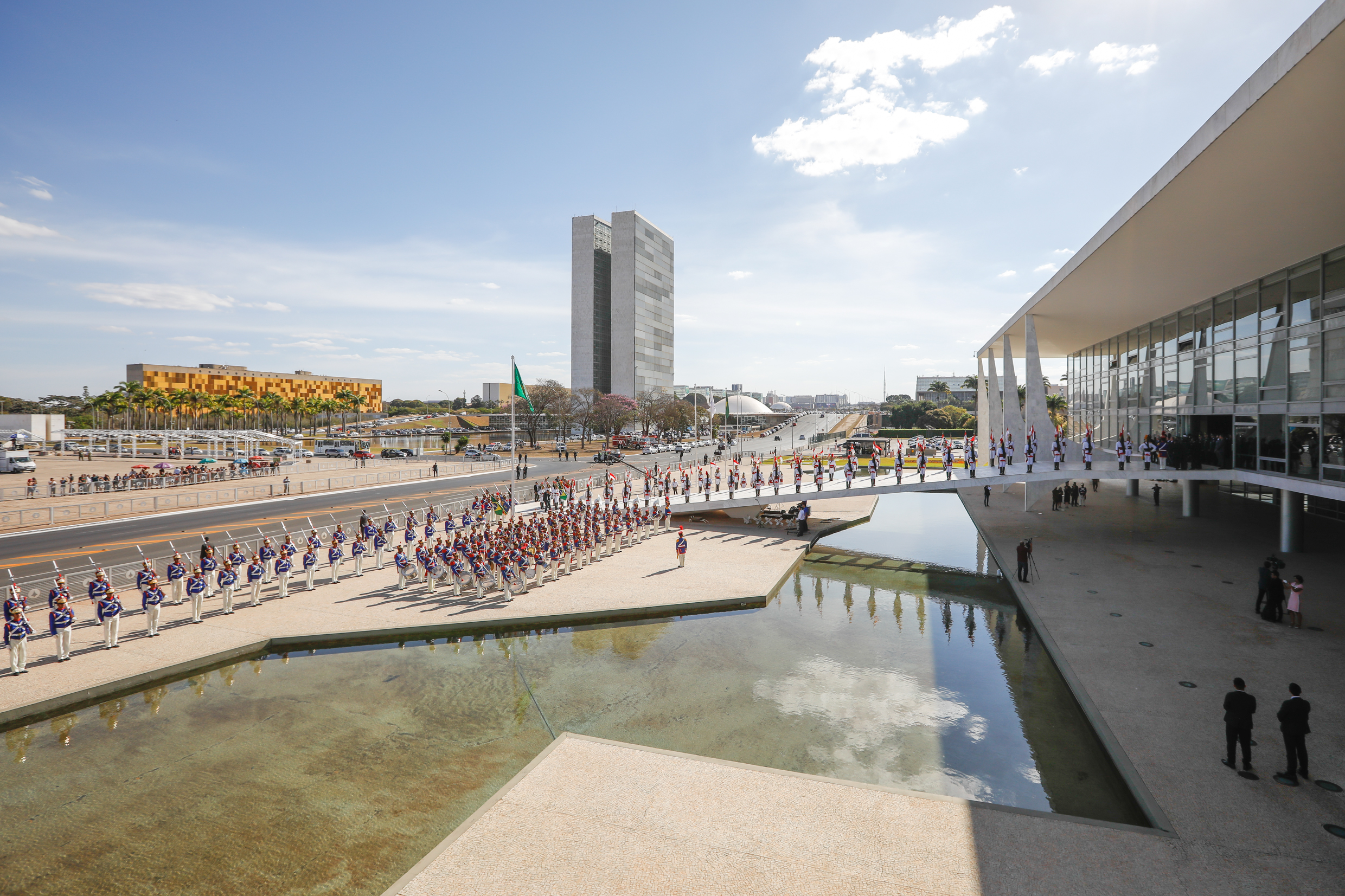
BGP and Independence Dragoons at the Palácio do Planalto

"Military guard organizations" belong to the infantry and cavalry and are dedicated to security and military ceremonies. In law and order operations, they can carry out search and arrest, overt patrolling and riot control, among other activities. The three guard cavalry regiments are the last ones still mounted on horseback in Brazil.

Two guard units alternate security at the ramp at Palácio do Planalto, Brazil's presidential workplace: the Presidential Guard Battalion (Batalhão da Guarda Presidencial; BGP) and the 1st Guard Cavalry Regiment, known as the "Independence Dragoons". The BGP has guard and ceremonial duties for the president, foreign heads of state and the diplomatic corps. During demonstrations, it acts as riot police, armed with shields, batons, pepper spray and rubber bullets.

== Equipment ==
=== Armored vehicles ===
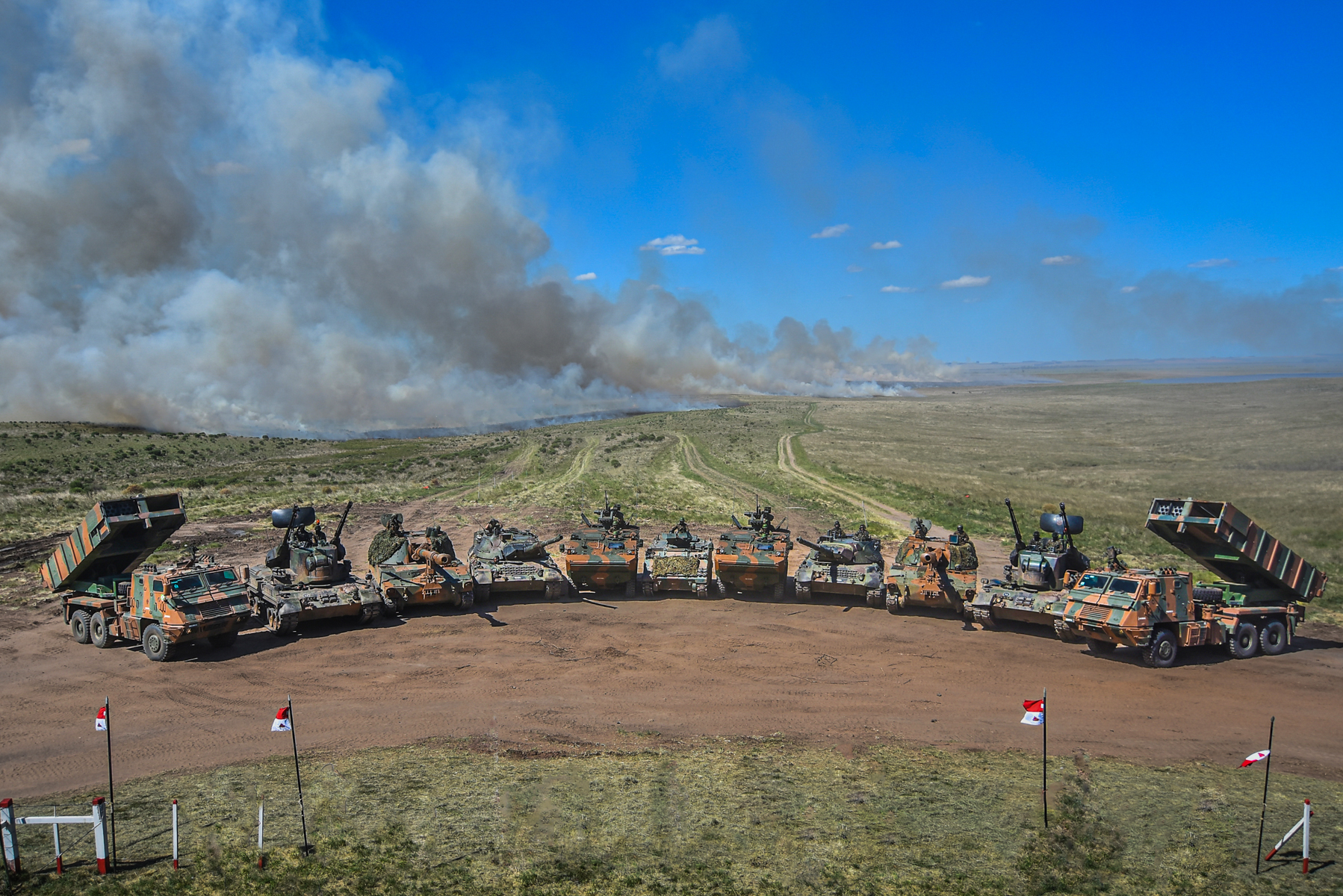
From left to right: ASTROS II, Gepard, M109, Leopard 1, VBTP-MR Guarani and M113

In the Brazilian Army, forces centered on armored combat vehicles are classified as "armored" if their vehicles move on tracks and "mechanized" if they use wheels. The "backbone" of armored forces and cavalry is the Leopard 1A5 BR tank. In 2023, the army operated 220 units of this model, 41 of the Leopard 1A1 BE and 35 of the M60 A3 TTS, for a total of 296 main battle tanks (MBTs). They are complemented by 660 tracked armored personnel carriers (APCs) of various M-113 and M577A2 models, at least seven armored engineering vehicles, thirteen recovery vehicles, and five bridge launchers. Armored brigades have no infantry fighting vehicles (IFVs). Mechanized forces have around 575 Guarani and 46 EE-11 Urutu APCs, 408 EE-9 Cascavel armored reconnaissance vehicles and 32 Guaicurus light mobility vehicles. The IISS includes 13 Guaranis armed with 30 mm guns as the Brazilian Army's only IFVs.

Quantitatively, the Brazilian Army has the largest fleet of MBTs in South America. However, only the Chilean Army has modern MBTs, according to the IISS classification. This condition of numerical advantage, in tanks and in armored vehicles in general, is the same as that observed in numbers from the 2000s and early 2010s. Qualitatively, the region's armies, with the exception of Chile's, operated armored vehicles designed in the 1960s and 1970s. The Leopard 1A5, for example, has technology from the 1980s, but was purchased by Brazil in the 2000s. The spread of anti-tank missiles in the armies of neighboring countries is already a threat to Brazilian armored forces. The Armored Forces Subprogram Implementation Guideline, in 2020, recognized that the majority of the armored vehicle fleet was already close to the end of its life cycle.

=== Artillery ===
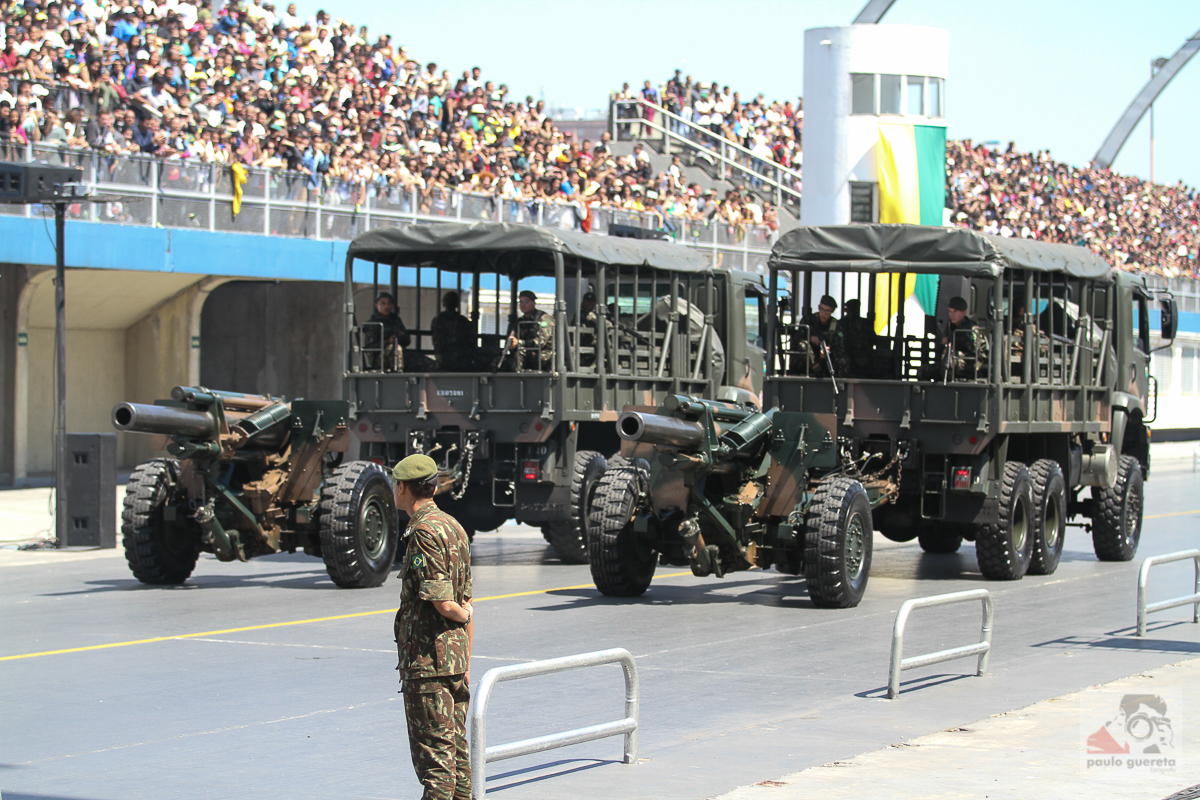
Towed M114 howitzers

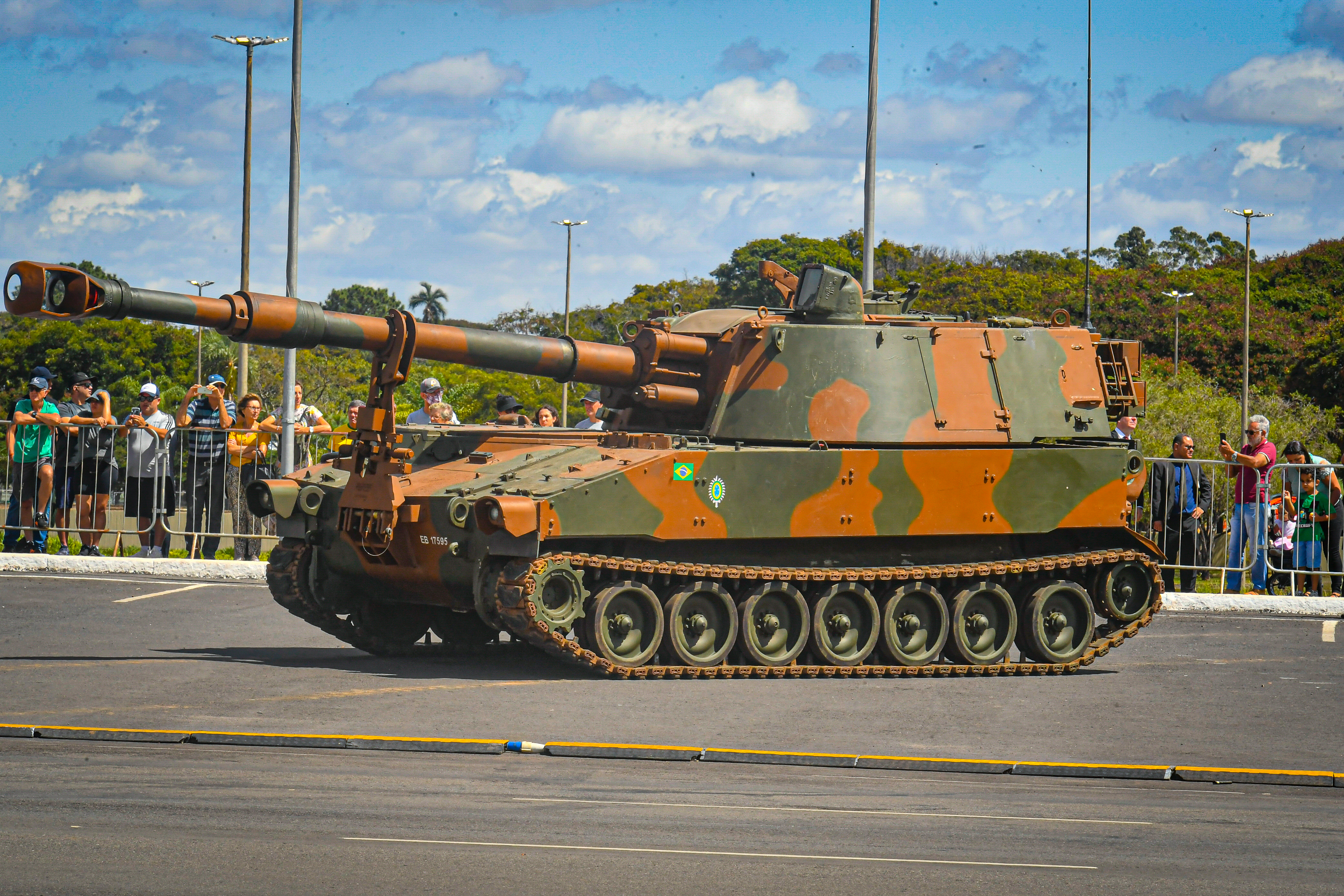
M109 self-propelled howitzer

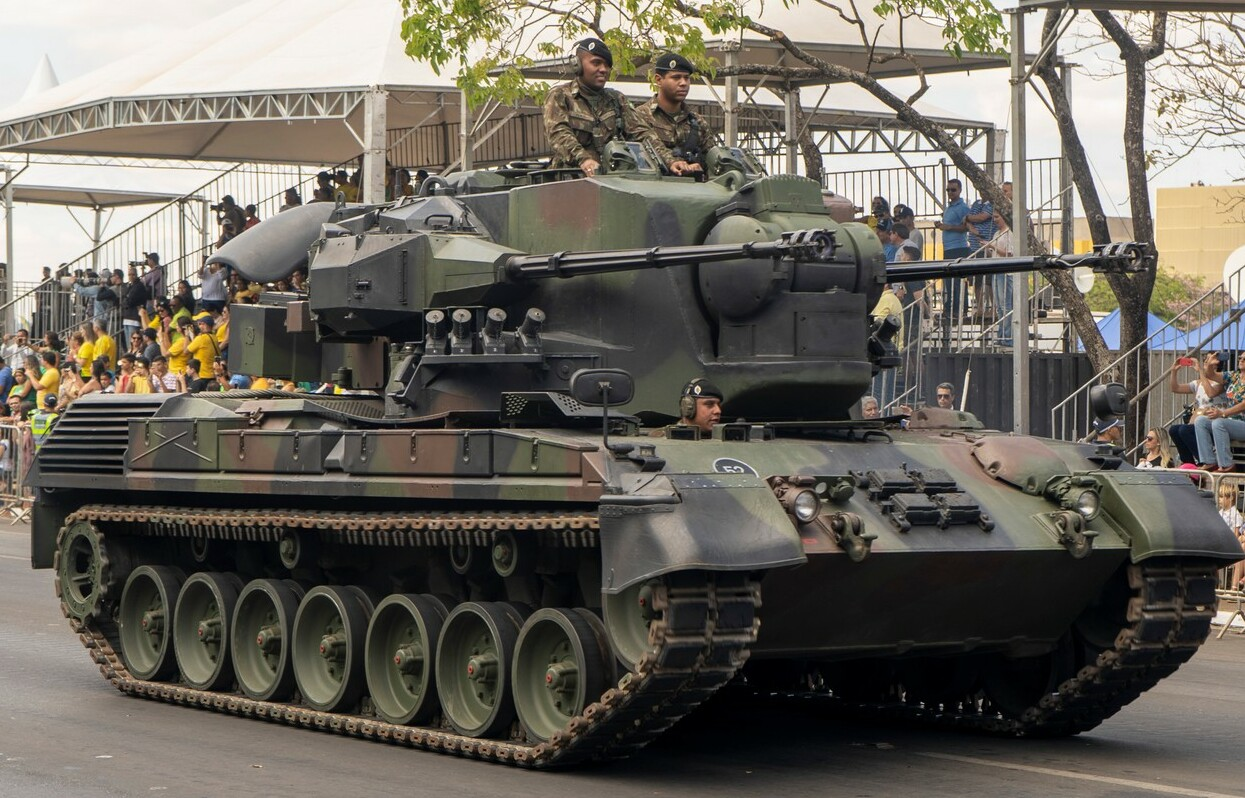
Gepard anti-aircraft system

The artillery branch is subdivided into groups and batteries of field artillery, missile and rocket artillery and anti-aircraft artillery. (Note: Coastal artillery is still officially one of the subdivisions of the branch, but all such batteries have already been disbanded. See Paiva, Alexandre Figueiredo de (2013). Evolução da artilharia de costa no Brasil (PDF) (Thesis). Escola de Artilharia de Costa e Antiaérea.) The IISS estimated a total of 1,881 pieces of field and missile and rocket artillery in 2023: 1,245 mortars (of which 1,168 are 81 mm caliber and the rest 120 mm), 431 towed artillery pieces (336 105 mm and 95 155 mm), 169 pieces of 155 mm self-propelled artillery and 36 missile and rocket launchers. However, there are smaller numbers of several models. (Note: IISS, The Military Balance (2023), p. 384. The IISS reports 63 Oto Melara M56 howitzers, compared to 54 given by the magazine Tecnologia & Defesa (T&D). The IISS reports 96 M114 howitzers, compared to 92 in InfoDefensa, and 169 of various models of the M109, compared to 136 in InfoDefensa.) The number was similar around 2009, representing a slight numerical preponderance on the continent.

In terms of technology, modern missile launchers coexist with howitzers manufactured in the 1950s, with an average range of ten to fifteen kilometers. The most sophisticated systems are in the missile and rocket artillery, with ASTROS II platforms organized into two Missile and Rocket Groups, totaling 78 launch, command post, communications, radars, workshops and meteorological vehicles. They are headquartered in Formosa, Goiás, and subordinate to the Army Artillery Command. This is the army's strategic artillery, with the greatest ranges — up to 90 kilometers with cluster munition rockets or 300 kilometers with cruise missiles, although the latter were not yet in service in 2023.

Self-propelled field artillery units, which support the armored brigades, have several models of the 155mm M109 howitzer, supported by M992 A2 resupply vehicles. The rest of the field artillery uses 105 mm howitzers such as the M101 and M102, and M114 155 mm models. Paratroopers and light infantry are supported by Oto Melara M56 and L118 airborne howitzers, both 105 mm. The 120 mm M2 heavy rifled mortar is also important.

Anti-aircraft artillery forces have 34 Gepard armored vehicles, distributed among the armored brigades, and 9K338 Igla-S, RBS 70 and RBS NG portable surface-to-air missiles (MANPADS). All are of low altitude and range. The Brazilian Army does not have a medium-altitude anti-aircraft defense system.

=== Aviation ===
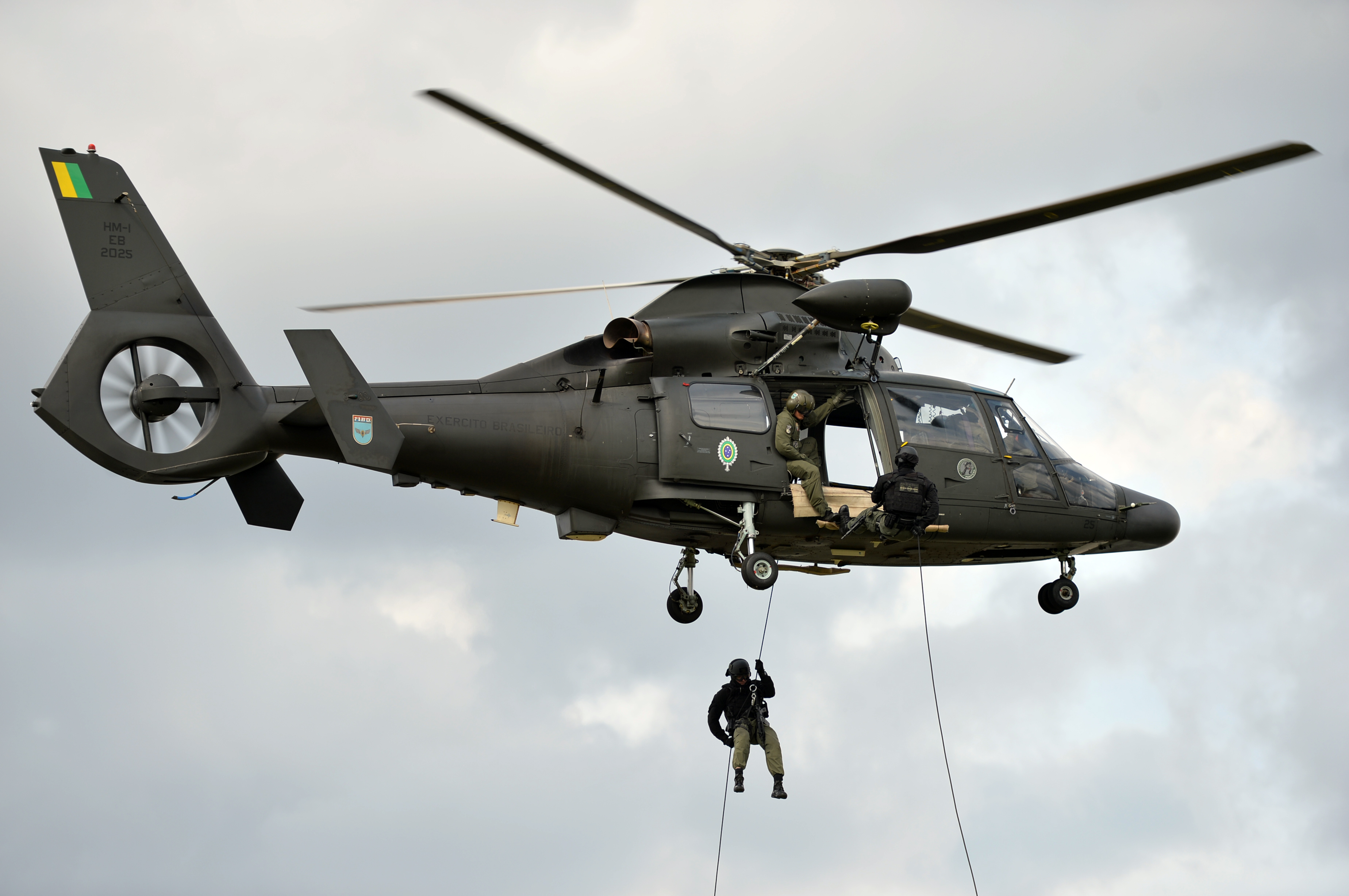
Army Aviation Helicopter

In 2022, Brazilian Army Aviation operated 95 helicopters of the HA-1 Esquilo, HM-1 Pantera, HM-2 Black Hawk, HM-3 Cougar and HM-4 Jaguar models. In the early 2000s, the Brazilian fleet was the second largest among South American armies. In line with most army aviation forces in the region, it focuses on transport helicopters and has no dedicated attack helicopters. The transport capacity of the aircraft based at the Taubaté Aviation Base in 2020, close to the 12th Light Infantry Brigade (Airmobile), is not enough to transport an entire infantry battalion in one wave.

== See also ==
- Brazilian Marine Corps
