= Rasga-listas =

The rasga-listas (English: list tearers or list rippers) were resistance movements to the 1874 lottery law for compulsory military service in the Empire of Brazil. In 1875, when enlistment for the lottery was due to begin, the rebels managed to turn the law into a "dead charter", postponing the lottery indefinitely. The law abolished the forced recruitment practiced by the Armed Forces until then. The old model, known as "blood tax", was violently conducted by a State with limited administrative and extractive capacity over the population, being a cause of popular rejection of military service. A balance between the State, local authorities and free workers protected workers inserted in patronage networks from recruitment, restricting military service to the "rabble" of society. The system captured few recruits and proved ineffective during the Paraguayan War (1864–1870). The lottery was a European-inspired modernizing reform intended to make recruitment more rational and egalitarian. A large part of the population did not consider equality in the lottery to be fair and did not trust its directors. The lottery did not change the exempt position of the rich, but it tightened the state's demands on the poor population, removing patronage protection. Its beneficiaries, both landowners and workers, did not accept the threat to their way of living with the old recruitment system.

Armed mobs of rebels stormed the draft boards and tore up their lists to stop the process. The rebels exhibited great capacity for collective action and were limited in their use of violence. The movement was popular, with support from local elites and prominent female participation (as in the Women's Mutiny). Its geographic reach was vast, occurring in ten provinces of the current Southeast and Northeast regions, with the greatest strength in Minas Gerais and in the northeastern agreste. Its character was legitimist and reactive, defending established rights and the "natural order" against the threat of the new law. It was typical of the interior revolts that took place in Brazil from 1870 onwards, reacting to modernizing reforms. In the Northeast, it was contemporary and had a similar geography to the Quebra-Quilos Revolt. A new Lottery Law, passed in 1908, was finally implemented in 1916.

== The 1874 Sortition Law ==
Soldiers in 19th century Brazil were recruited voluntarily or by force. Recruitment focused on "vagrants, ex-slaves, orphans, criminals, migrants, unskilled workers and the unemployed". Military service was considered degrading by the free poor population. Recruitment, called "blood tax" at the time, was violent and followed by a life of punishment and low pay. It managed to attract few recruits, as it was carried out by a weak state (police, civil service and civil registry) in a resistant population. The Paraguayan War strained the system and was time-consuming in part due to inefficient mobilization. In Europe, a reference for the Brazilian elite, the period after the Franco-Prussian War (1870–1871) was marked by industrialization, states with greater control over their populations and conscript armies, which, after 1–3 years of service, followed into a growing reserve. Brazil was very far from this model.

Recruitment reform was demanded by military officers and discussed by parliamentarians for decades. It was finally implemented with Law No. 2,556 of 1874, inspired by the French recruitment system. Parish boards composed of the justice of the peace, vicar, and the most senior police officer would hold a first lottery of free men aged 19 to 30 for six years of service. The following lotteries, held annually, would choose between 19-year-old men. The lottery would only take place if there were no volunteers to fill the ranks. The reformers thus intended to modernize the Army in the European model, replacing the "human hunt" with a more rational and fair system. For them, the law was a major institutional advance. The Army's manpower, and thus its capacity for national defense, would be improved. The government was then surprised by a negative popular reaction, from almost all social strata.

The social status of draftees would be higher than former forced recruits, and thus, the service was made more attractive with a ban on corporal punishments and preferences for veterans in admission to public employment. The distribution of the military burden would be through a theoretically blind, equiprobable and impersonal lottery. The rich would remain exempt, however, while the free poor would be hardest hit. Rural workers would lose their traditional paternal protection from landowners. This clientelistic protection was accepted by the "honored poor", small farmers who fulfilled their family and National Guard obligations, for whom forced recruitment was a natural way of differentiating themselves from the lower strata of the population. Traditional recruits were considered riffraff. Equality with them, as would happen in the lottery, would be an odious situation. The protégés considered the inequality in recruitment fair. Society knew how to live with forced recruitment. It fulfilled a moral function, punishing "robust individuals, petty criminals, unfaithful husbands, ungrateful children, less diligent workers."

Populations hitherto invisible to the state and hostile to the 1872 Demographic Census would be enlisted. The drawing would not really be equiprobable and impersonal, as the honesty of the recruiters was not relied on. The difference would be that the exemption, previously regulated by law, would be hidden, becoming a market object. The absence of the traditional exemption for married men created resistance to the law among women, although the number of married people until then exempt was not so great, as there were a large number of illegitimate unions and concubinage relationships among the poor. The first lottery would likely be the one with many married couples. Landowners also had a conflict of interest with reformers and the Armed Forces over access to workers. The law could mean the loss of workforce in the fields and the ability to protect workers, children and relatives. Another problem in implementing the law would be the weakness of the state bureaucracy.

== Seditions against the law ==
The enlistment boards were supposed to meet in the churches (centers of public activities) on 1 August 1875. With the news spread, tensions already arose in the preceding months. The malcontents had a simple solution: destroy the drafts. On the day of the meeting, mobs in ten provinces stormed the churches, impeded the work of the boards, and tore up the lists. The rebels could be unarmed or carry sticks, sickles or firearms. The use of violence was regulated, and the reports from the boards often took the form of dialogues between the recruiters and the population. Where there was resistance from the police, the raids resulted in some deaths and injuries. The collective action was well structured and the movements sometimes went beyond the limits of the parishes. Many boards did not meet due to the absence of their members, intimidated by threats made by the rasga-listas or in agreement with them. There was a special absence of parish priests due to the Religious Issue. There are even records of the authorities participating in the crowds. The activity of the rebels continued throughout the months of joint work and reappeared whenever the government tried to implement the law. The targets were expanded to Masonic lodges, collectors and municipal taxes. Attacks on conscription work continued for years, such as in Serro, Minas Gerais, in 1881, and in Conceição das Alagoas in 1884.

The historical subjects of the movement were anonymous, and many facts were not recorded. The movement was popular, but it had the connivance or support from local elites. Due to the outstanding female participation, the movement was also called “Women's War”. In Mossoró, Rio Grande do Norte, the organization and execution were exclusively led by women, in the so-called "Women's Mutiny". The geographic distribution was wide, occurring in numerous parishes in Minas Gerais, São Paulo, Rio de Janeiro, Espírito Santo, Bahia, Alagoas, Pernambuco, Paraíba, Rio Grande do Norte and Ceará. In Rio Grande do Sul the greater presence of troops prevented riots, but the enlistment suffered many manipulations. The rebel concentrations were in Minas Gerais and in the northeastern agreste, both marked by the greater importance of free work. Minas Gerais also had a population too dispersed for troops to defend the recruitment boards, and a traditional aversion to military service. In August, the board was attacked in 78 localities in the province by mobs of 30 to 500 people, with further fighting continuing until April 1876. The destruction of the lists was accompanied by festive celebrations in the cities. Seditions in São Paulo were limited to regions bordering Minas Gerais. In Ceará, a poor and populous province with a heavy recruitment burden, the revolt was a consequence of the Paraguayan War and rumors circulated of recruitment for a new conflict in Paraguay.

At the time, the rebels were accused of fanaticism, misunderstanding and especially ignorance. Part of the historiography considers the rasga-listas as "pre-political" social movements of the sertão, associating them with cangaço and messianism. But the free population had its reasons. The movement was reactive and legitimist, defending established rights and the "natural order of things" against what was considered an unwarranted expansion of government demands. Thus, it was typical of pre-industrial revolts in Europe, a Brazilian vendée or jacquerie. The reform hurt the sertanejos' sense of justice, based more on customs than on the laws of a distant state. In the Northeast, the rasga-listas had a geography similar to that of the Quebra-Quilos revolt, a movement contrary to the implementation of the metric system, but also to the new recruitment law, and the Ronco da Abelha Revolt and the "Marimbondos", years earlier. They had in common the fears of the sertanejos with the secularization and rationalization imposed by the Europeanizing elites. This unrest would begin in the 1870s, with the Muckers and the Vintém revols, ending with the Canudos and Contestado Wars, decades later.

The crowds cheered the monarchy, the Catholic Church and the old law, presenting themselves as restorers of order. The new law was called "barbaric", having come to "enslave the people". The rasga-listas claimed to be defenders of religion and were hostile to Freemasonry, reflecting the rupture between State and Church that occurred with the Religious Issue. In some places they were in favor of the Liberal Party due to some of this party's leadership that was against the law. However, the discontent went beyond religious and partisan issues.

== Results ==
The 1874 law became a "dead charter". Resistance in the elite and popular groups was very strong. The lottery in the Army was delayed thanks to a slight increase in the number of volunteers in 1875–1876 and cuts in personnel in 1877–1880. Forced conscription was formally abolished, but the police compelled prisoners to enlist as volunteers. The political elite, which also benefited from patronage, knew how to retreat. Consensus grew around forced recruitment, rather than drawing lots in the balance between the state, local elites and the honorable poor. In 1903, an attempt to sort maritime workers for the Navy was abandoned after it was met with a strike by dockers. The old system lasted until a new lottery law. The demand for military modernization remained, and the lottery was approved in 1908, but it also encountered difficulties. The first lottery under the new law was not held until 1916.
