= Blood tax (Brazil) =

Historical army recruitment method

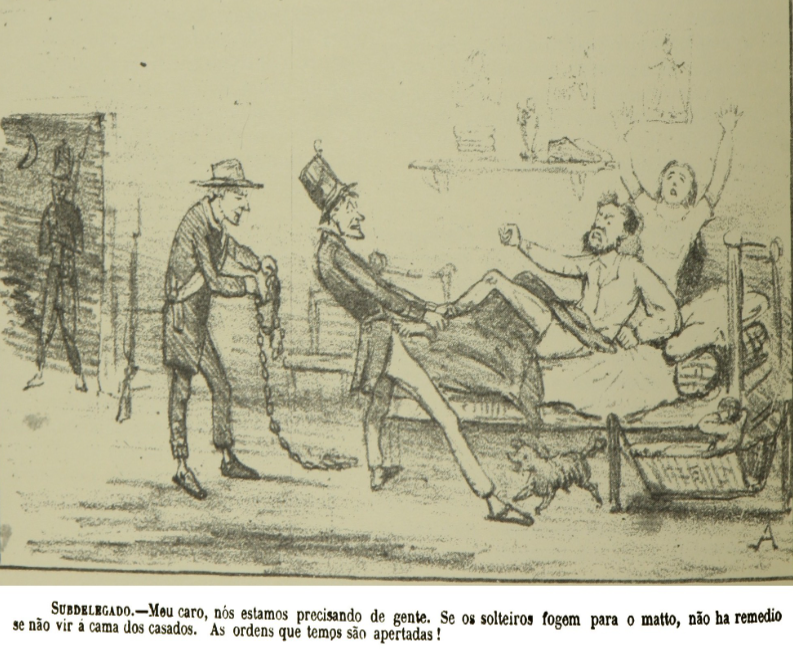
Satire by the magazine Cabrião, 23 December 1866. The caption reads: "Police officer: My dear, we are in need of people. If the single [men] flee to the woods, there's no remedy other than coming to the married's bed. The orders we have are tight!"

The so-called "blood tax" (Portuguese: tributo de sangue) was how forced recruitment into the Brazilian Armed Forces was known until the introduction of mandatory military service based on the Sortition Law in 1916. An older law had already established conscription by sortition in 1874, but popular resistance from the "list rippers" prevented its implementation, and forced recruitment continued to exist in practice. In this model, incorporated contingents were small. Soldiers were professionals, sometimes serving for up to 20 years, and were not sent into reserve at the end of their service. Not all soldiers and sailors were forced into service, as there were volunteers. The state had a low degree of bureaucratization and grasp over the population, leaving the administration of recruitment to the influence of local elites. The Imperial Brazilian Army had little control over the process. Impressment of recruits was carried out by police and military detachments.

With origins in Europe, Brazilian forced recruitment had existed since the colonial period. Recruitment was violent, called "human hunting", and military service took place under harsh conditions and was considered a punishment. The free poor did their best to escape recruiters, and recruitment of workers could damage the economy. Central authorities, wishing to fill the ranks without harming the economy, lived in a precarious balance with administrative agents, who needed to fulfill the task without interfering in patronage networks, and the free population. Recruitment ran up against a large number of exemptions defined by law, such as for national guardsmen, and a network of patronage protection which kept out of reach workers protected by local elites. For patrons, choosing who would be protected was a powerful instrument of control. Recruitment fell on those who could not find protection, considered the unproductive portion of the population. Popular morality had an ideal of what fair recruitment was and who was deserving or undeserving of impressment.

Forced recruitment was not enough to fill even the small number of Army troops in peacetime. In 1874, the Minister of War estimated that it was necessary to arrest 20,000 individuals to obtain 2,000 recruits. The great demand for troops in the Paraguayan War (1864–1870) overloaded the system and created tension in its social relations. The inefficiency of mobilization was one of the reasons why the war took so long. Both military officers and reformist parliamentarians wanted to reform recruitment throughout the 19th century, seeking to civilize the "human hunt" and modernize the Armed Forces. The inspiration was European armies, whether built by compulsory military service or by volunteering. The 1874 reform attempt failed because it threatened the society's mode of coexistence with impressment, and even the first military lottery in 1916 came eight years after the new law was passed in 1908.

== Service model ==
There was continuity in the recruitment of soldiers between the beginning of the Republic, the Empire of Brazil, the colony and Portugal, although the Portuguese model in the 17th and 18th centuries, typical of the European Old Regime, found different conditions in Portuguese America. The distinction between regular or first-line troops and the milícias and ordenanças was also a Portuguese heritage. These were replaced in the Empire of Brazil by the National Guard, whose recruitment (called "enlistment") was complementary and antagonistic, absorbing personnel of a higher social level. National guardsmen were exempt from recruitment into the Army and Navy, and the institution was therefore one of the forms of evasion. National guardsmen were considered citizens and qualified, and their service a duty to the country, very different from first-line troops.

Soldiers entered military service voluntarily or by force. In 19th century Brazil, "recruitment" was synonymous with forced recruitment. Authorities would refer to the "seizure" and "arrest" of recruits. There was no neutral term to refer to all recruits (volunteers or obligated). The term "recruited" was sometimes used specifically for the obligated. In the legislation on the subject, the term "forced recruitment" appears in the decree of 1835, but not in the ministerial instruction of 1822, which established escorts for recruits, but without chains, handcuffs or shackles. Even so, there were reports of recruitment literally "with a snare", with recruits being tied up. The free population saw military service as degrading, and since the 17th century authorities had noted the repugnance with which it was perceived. The violence and arbitrariness of recruitment, added to the harsh discipline and low remuneration in service, gave it the connotation of punishment, being associated with captivity in the popular imagination. The process was called "human hunting" or "blood tax".

Few joined voluntarily. Volunteers were mainly unemployed or escaped from the authorities, but also some children of soldiers, problematic children enlisted by their parents and poor boys in search of social mobility; even among small landowners, many lived in worse conditions than those of the soldiers. Volunteering was a possible escape from "hunger, unemployment, homelessness and, at times, slavery". During the Brazilian War of Independence there was genuine military enthusiasm among the population, but it was the exception to the rule. The 1835 decree granted volunteers a bonus pay, differential treatment, shorter service time and the possibility to serve closer to their family, but the incentives were not enough for the volunteers to cease being a minority. In the Navy there was another means of entry, the Schools for Apprentice-Sailors.

Soldiers were professionals, serving until expulsion or end of career. They were not sent into reserve. Length of service varied: in 1808 it was 16 years for forced recruits and 8 years for volunteers, dropping to 6 years for both in 1875 and 3 in 1891. The best ones renewed their service for up to 20 years, at which point retirement was guaranteed. In the Empire, with the difficulty of replacing personnel, it was common for the State to illegally prolong the period of service. Graduados (corporals, sergeants, and warrant officers) came from the ranks of soldiers. During long periods of service, older soldiers became attached to their chiefs, installed their families near the barracks, and were accompanied by their women on campaign.

== Execution of recruitment ==
The Portuguese Crown and later the Imperial State had a low degree of bureaucratization. Police forces had few means to act, there was a lack of qualified manpower in the administration and it was very difficult to maintain a civil registry and carry out a population census. There was resistance to the census, as in the Ronco da Abelha revolt, and one of the reasons was precisely fear of recruitment. There wasn't a sufficient enforcement and monitoring apparatus to directly tax and recruit the population. The solution was to delegate powers to local potentates. The administration and supply of recruits were the responsibility of militia and National Guard officers, police delegates and sub-delegates, local parish priests and justices of the peace, linked to local potentates, involving private interests. The Army had a limited role in the process, although it contributed with detachments.

The state was strengthened, but so were the local authorities. Control over who would and would not be recruited was a powerful instrument. Recruitment was considered pernicious for elections, as it was common to recruit political opponents, to the point that an 1846 law prohibited it between 60 days before and 30 days after elections, but its application was limited. The political elite was part of the class that benefited from patronage, protecting its clients from recruitment. Once coronelism developed, the threat of recruitment was one of the ways through which coronéis (local oligarchs) intimidated voters into voting as they wished.

Recruiting agent activity was not regular, but episodic and unpredictable. It caused social disorganization and yet it did not meet the needs of the Army. Large escapes occurred when agents arrived, and the population covered the fugitives. The free poor population continually migrated through the immensity of the country, and one of the reasons was the fear of recruitment. The abandonment of towns and cities and the flight of young men harmed the economy: "at their approach journeymen disappeared and harvests were lost". The Armed Forces competed with landowners, who did not want to lose laborers on their crops. To succeed, recruiters needed secrecy and simultaneity and used numerous ruses, increasing the hostility of the population. Recruitment was a "cat-and-mouse game".

== Role in society ==
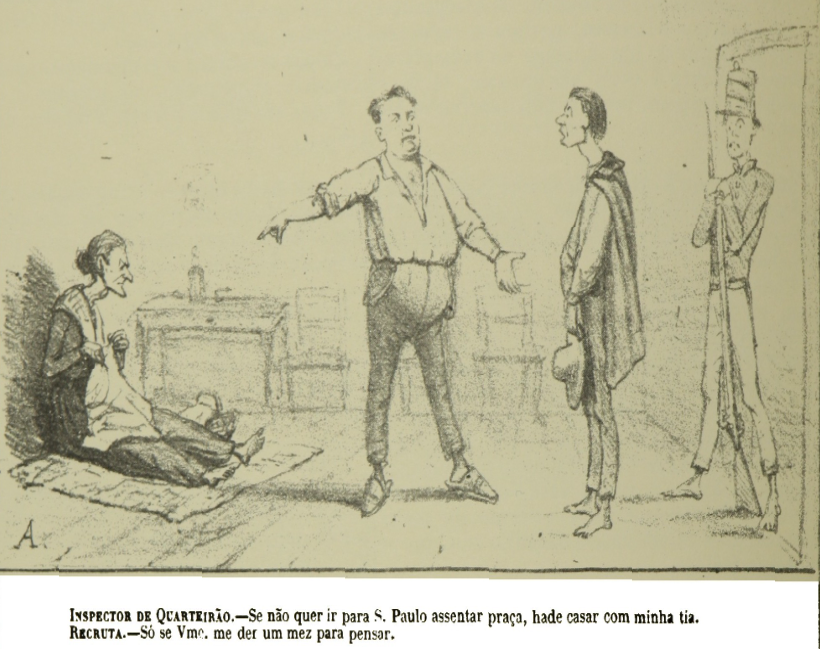
Satire by the magazine Cabrião, 23 December 1866. The caption reads: "Block inspector: - If you don't want to go to S. Paulo to join the army, you shall marry my aunt. Recruit: Only if ye give me a month to think".

The main obstacles to recruitment were local privileges, exemptions and safety nets. Not only were the rich immune, but their servants and dependents as well. The exemptions de-universalized the service. Their goal was to protect the helpless (widows, orphans, married people, only children) and not harm the economy. Single men aged 18 to 35 were recruitable. The wealthy could buy exemptions or provide substitutes, and there were numerous exemptions for the economically active population, such as one child from each farmer and a few employees from each shop. The clause "as long as they carry out their jobs effectively and behave well" gave recruiters room for discretion. Exempt individuals were captured, but provincial presidents, representatives of the Crown, released many of the recruits, reinforcing their legitimacy. Petitions were addressed to provincial presidents, police chiefs and, after 1871, to the courts. Many of the petitions were made by women. Recruits and recruiters fought wars of documents to prove or disprove that they fit in an exemption. Hasty marriages, forgery, self-mutilation and migrations were also forms of evasion.

The free poor took refuge in local bosses, who could obstruct recruitment or intercede for exemption. Disputes between local lords, each defending their clients, could hamper recruitment, and sometimes there was violent resistance. If recruiters used excessive violence, workers would disappear into the countryside. There was a fragile balance between the central power, wishing to fill the ranks without harming the economy, administrative agents, who needed to comply with the law without interfering with patronage networks, and the population, which sought protection in these networks. Recruitment was limited, with many releases, and fell on those who could not find protection, such as travellers, itinerant workers and farmers selling their crops far from their lands, but especially on men considered idle and vagrants, a portion of the population considered unproductive.

Those recruited were "vagrants, ex-slaves, orphans, criminals, migrants, unskilled workers and the unemployed", contributing to the degrading connotation of military service. The barracks were "the male equivalent of brothels", and the soldiers, seen as "degenerates, criminals, sick, misfits and social irrecoverables". The police used recruitment to get rid of troublemakers not convicted by the courts. For the Navy and other institutions, military service with harsh discipline would serve as moral correction for recruits. Mass recruitments were used as punishment after the revolts of the regency period, with recruits being transferred to distant and remote provinces, but under normal conditions the number of inductees was reduced. The role of military service in maintaining order was paltry, given the very small number of inductees. Not everyone had a negative view of military service. Some soldiers, their families and friends were proud of their careers, and politicians differentiated between law-abiding soldiers and "degenerates" in their speeches.

Distributive justice was the problem in the choice of recruits, governed not only by the law but also by a "moral economy of unwritten rules" and conceptions of who should receive the burdens. The "honorable poor", small farmers who fulfilled their family and National Guard obligations, saw recruitment and patronage as a natural way of differentiating themselves from socially undesirable individuals. It fulfilled a moral function, distinguishing between the "married and badly married, good and bad children, industrious and idle craftsmen." Before the abolition of slavery, recruitment separated the law-abiding and criminal, legitimate and illegitimate, free and slave, the honorable poor from dishonored, and respected or dishonorable masculinity. As arbitrary and confusing as it was, there was a precarious way of living with the blood tax.

== Mobilization capacity ==
The Empire of Brazil kept the army small, oscillating in peacetime between 15,000 and 20,000 men after 1830. A quarter of these needed to be replaced annually due to illness, death, end of service and desertion. Even with the small force, recruitment was not enough to fill the ranks. Soldiers were "difficult to find and make, and easily volatilized." It was not possible to incorporate large numbers. In 1874, João José de Oliveira Junqueira Júnior, the Minister of War, calculated that the arrest 20,000 people would be needed to make 2,000 recruits. The rest were lost to exemptions, physical defects and escapes.

From 1860 to 1875, the provinces of Alagoas, Amazonas, Espírito Santo, Maranhão, Pará, Pernambuco and Sergipe, in addition to the Court, contributed a number of recruits proportionally greater than their population. The provinces of Bahia, Minas Gerais, Paraíba, Rio Grande do Norte, Santa Catarina and São Paulo had a lower per capita contribution. The representation of the other provinces fluctuated. Minas Gerais, a large and populous province, stood out for its insignificant participation. Army troops had little presence to meet recruitment quotas. The provinces of the Imperial North (present-day North and Northeast) as a whole contributed 53% of those recruited during the Paraguayan War.

The Paraguayan War was protracted in part because of the difficulty to mobilize troops. The recruitment system did not withstand the pressure. Even with the appeal to the Fatherland Volunteers, initial popular enthusiasm waned. The war required large-scale forced recruitment, arresting men traditionally free from military service. The "sanctity" of the domestic environment was threatened, and "family men" were forced to serve alongside slaves and criminals. The Army had to interfere with the National Guard, a traditional refuge for recruitment. There was resistance from local elites and free poor.

== Reform attempts ==
Officials had been advocating recruitment reform since the 1840s, desiring a workforce of better quality. In the Legislature, it had been discussed since 1827 and the current model was condemned in rhetoric, but successive projects failed to eliminate it, showing how much it was still convenient for power. In Europe, a reference for the Brazilian elite, the model after the Franco-Prussian War (1870–1871) was that of industrialization, states with greater control over the population and large conscript armies, which, after 1 to 3 years of service, went into a growing reserve, to be mobilized during wartime through rail networks. Forced recruitment was far from the elites' ideal of civilization. After the exhaustion of the model evidenced by the Paraguayan War, in 1874 a law was finally approved for conscription by lottery, inspired by the French model. The Prussian model of conscription of entire classes and the British model of a purely voluntary force were not accepted.

The law was met with opposition from almost all social classes. The military burden required by the state would become more comprehensive, obliging the aggregates of local chiefs to serve. Although seen by its directors as an institutional advance, it was a threat to the way of living established around recruitment and popular morality. In August 1875, on the day scheduled for the start of the enlistment, crowds of "list rippers" in ten provinces impeded the work. Resistance continued until it made the law a "dead letter", preserving the status quo. The current system was strengthened. The police could no longer hand over prisoners directly to the army, but instead had them volunteer.

The Brazilian Constitution of 1891 abolished forced recruitment on paper, and at the beginning of the Republic all soldiers were, on paper, volunteers. Forced recruitment continued to occur, however. In 1908 another sortition law was passed, but it was not implemented until 1916, replacing impressment. With the modernization of Argentina, seen as a possible enemy, and the demonstration of total war in World War I, the Brazilian model, without reserves and general mobilization, was obsolete.

== See also ==
- Voluntários da Pátria
- Conscription in Brazil
- Sortition Law
