= Sortition Law =

1908 Brazilian law on military service

- Long title: Law No. 1,860 of 4 January 1908
- Citation: Law No. 1,860 of 4 January 1908
- Territorial extent: Brazil
- Signed by: Afonso Pena
- Effective: 8 January 1908
- Introduced by: Alcindo Guanabara

Summary
- Regulates enlistment and military lottery and reorganizes the army

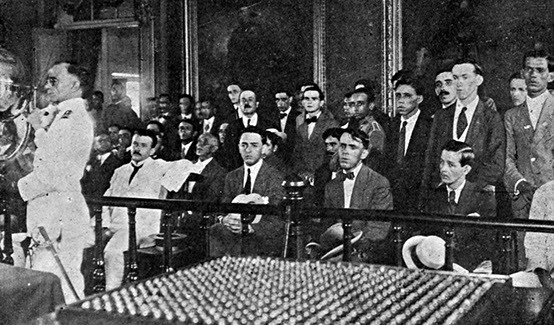

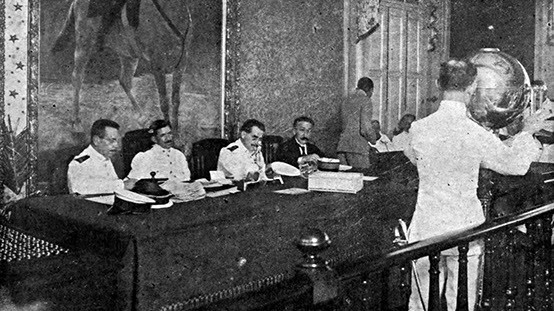
Young men anxiously awaiting the results of the military lottery ahead of the lottery balls with their number, 1918

The Sortition Law (Portuguese: Lei do Sorteio), officially Law No. 1,860 of 4 January 1908, introduced compulsory military service for the Brazilian Armed Forces. It was approved in 1906 but only de facto implemented in 1916, replacing forced recruitment - the antiquated "blood tax" - and allowing the formation of a reserve. Sortition or draft lottery was the mechanism used for recruiting soldiers from 1916 to 1945, when it was replaced by general class call, which is the mandatory military service system in 21st century-Brazil. An earlier law of 1874 had already introduced the lottery, but it was not applied due to popular resistance. Also controversial, the 1908 law was one of the major military reforms of the First Brazilian Republic and had lasting effects on the Brazilian Army's relationship with the country's politics and society. The arguments advanced by lottery advocates in 1908–1916 remain the official justifications for conscription a century later.

Recruitment reform had been advocated by military officers and politicians since the 19th century. The old system was violent, inefficient and out of the army's control. As it was characteristic of a weak central power, local oligarchs (coronéis) abused it. Since military service was seen as degrading, there were not enough volunteers to fill the ranks and the police arrested the "dregs of society" to serve. Reformists saw the military lottery as the most modern and rational form of recruitment. Their reference was Europe, where since the Franco-Prussian War (1870–1871) states had permanent officer corps (and some enlisted men) and variable enlisted personnel; young men served for short periods as soldiers and were sent into a growing reserve, which could be quickly mobilized during war. As in theory all classes should participate, armies would be the "nation in arms" and the "school of nationality", conferring national unity.

A 1906 proposal, drafted by deputy Alcindo Guanabara, was finally approved in 1908, with support among officers, the urban middle class and marshal Hermes da Fonseca's administration at the Ministry of War, during the presidency of Afonso Pena. For military officers who discussed reform of the army and its poor performance in campaigns, there were clear reasons for reform: to fill in the gaps in the number of troops, form reserves and not fall behind countries like Argentina and Chile, which had already implemented compulsory military service from 1900 onwards. Intellectuals such as Olavo Bilac were more ambitious, seeing in it social leveling and discipline and education of the masses, a "civilizing mission" to be carried out by the officers. The law was controversial and faced opposition from a varied range of ideological perspectives, such as anarchists, and both in large cities and in the countryside. The labor movement, in particular, made anti-militaristic opposition. Popular opposition, budget cuts and loss of interest from the civilian elite meant that the lottery was not applied immediately.

Only the impact of the First World War and a public relations campaign, with lectures by Olavo Bilac, breathed new life to the law, and the first lottery was held in December 1916. Its implementation was associated with the creation of the Tiros de Guerra, which were an alternative to conventional military service, the reorganization of the order of battle, construction of barracks, softening of discipline, extinction of the National Guard, and other changes. In the following decades, the lottery suffered from administrative limitations and insubmission – thousands of men were drawn annually, but for years in a row the majority of those called for service did not comply. Insubmission was only solved with punitive measures requiring the enlistment certificate. Contrary to what the law's defenders expected, there was no social leveling, and the lower military ranks continued to be occupied by the lower classes. Still, the lottery was successful in attracting recruits, their selection became more judicious and the reputation of soldiers slowly improved. The army's strength grew from 18,000 men in 1915 to 93,000 in 1940, gradually strengthening the central power against local oligarchies. The army reached out to all of society and had a greater capacity to spread its ideology. The Brazilian Navy and the Brazilian Air Force (created in 1941) took less advantage of the lottery.

== Background ==
=== Forced recruitment ===
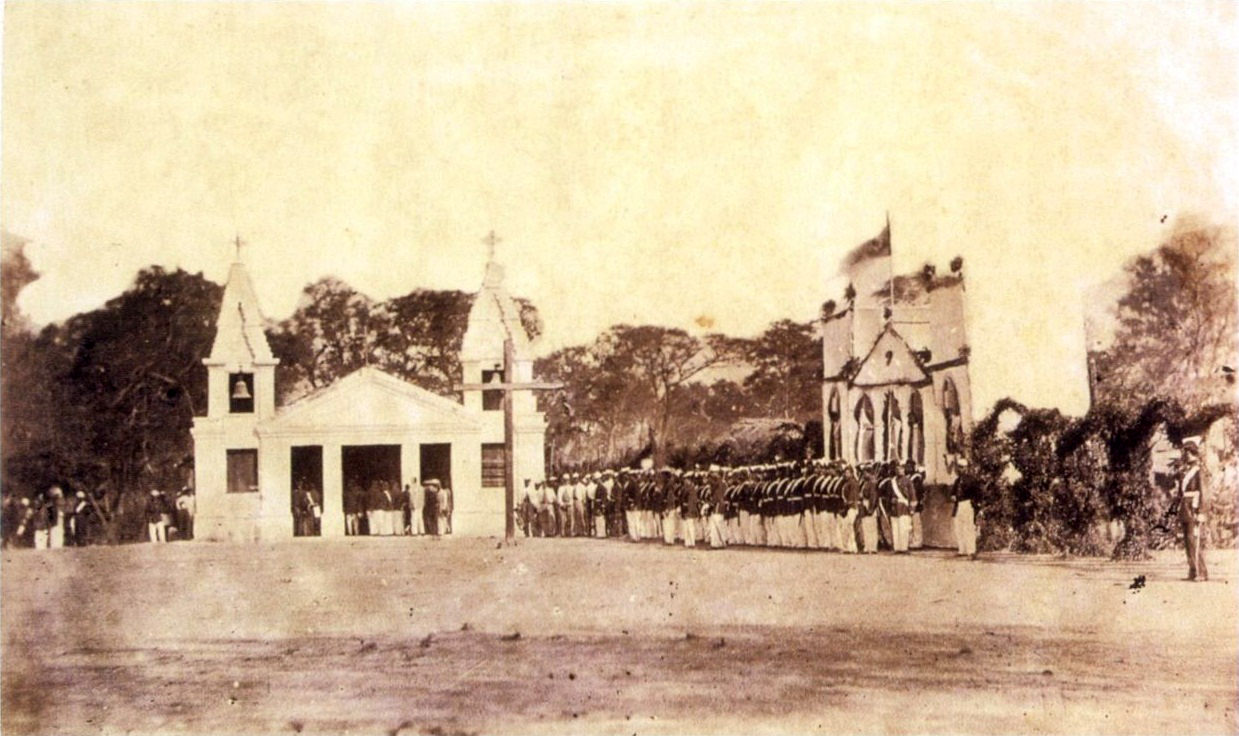
Brazilian soldiers in Rio Grande do Sul before being sent to the Paraguayan War in 1865

The Brazilian Army traces the beginnings of the current compulsory military service to laws created in the hereditary captaincies in the 16th century, but what existed in Colonial Brazil was a mixture of impressment and the feudal militia system. In the beginning, in addition to troops coming from Portugal, settlers were expected to organize their own defenses. In addition to the first-line paid troops, in which Brazilians and Portuguese served, there was a second line of milícias, armed on their own and summoned in certain situations, and a third line of ordenanças, with the rest of the inhabitants capable of wielding weapons. Milícias and ordenanças were replaced by the National Guard after Brazil's independence. Service in the National Guard was mandatory among citizens, that is, those who voted and had possessions, and it represented the upper class, unlike the army, where service was not mandatory.

Soldiers were incorporated by volunteering and, as it was insufficient to fill the ranks, by forced recruitment. The "human hunt" was a violent process, feared by the population, capable of putting workers on the run and damaging local economies; even so, it captured few recruits. The state had a weak bureaucracy and recruitment was under the influence of local elites, with little control by the army. In elections, recruitment was a tool against political opponents. Military service was considered a punishment, with harsh discipline and low pay, and soldiers were considered the "scum of society". Still, a precarious social balance kept recruitment under limits. Legal exemptions and a network of patronage protection isolated the so called "honorable poor", workers protected by local bosses. Service burden fell to the unproductive portion of society that "deserved punishment" in popular morality. As violent and inefficient as it was, the arrangement was accepted enough that the first attempt to replace it with conscription, in 1874, was defeated by popular resistance from the so-called "list rippers".

At the beginning of the First Brazilian Republic, the recruitment pattern of the Brazilian Empire remained. Every soldier was theoretically a "volunteer", but it was common for local state police to arrest the "scum of society" on the streets, who were then sent to the army and navy barracks. The Criminal Code of 1890 punished "vagrancy", "capoeiragem" (the practice of capoeira) and "begging" with imprisonment for a few days, in which prisoners committed themselves to some occupation, such as a military career. In the Brazilian Navy, in addition to the forced recruitment and enlistment of volunteers, there were the Schools for Apprentice-Sailors. According to officer Estevão Leitão de Carvalho, in 1913 the army's main sources of recruitment were refugees from droughts in Northeastern Brazil, criminals and the unemployed or unfit for work, an "inverted selection". Soldiers were frowned upon, and violence and drunkenness were routine in the barracks. The treatment and hygiene were abysmal. Officers maintained discipline by corporal punishment. In the navy, this resulted in the Revolt of the Lash in 1910.

=== Model's exhaustion ===
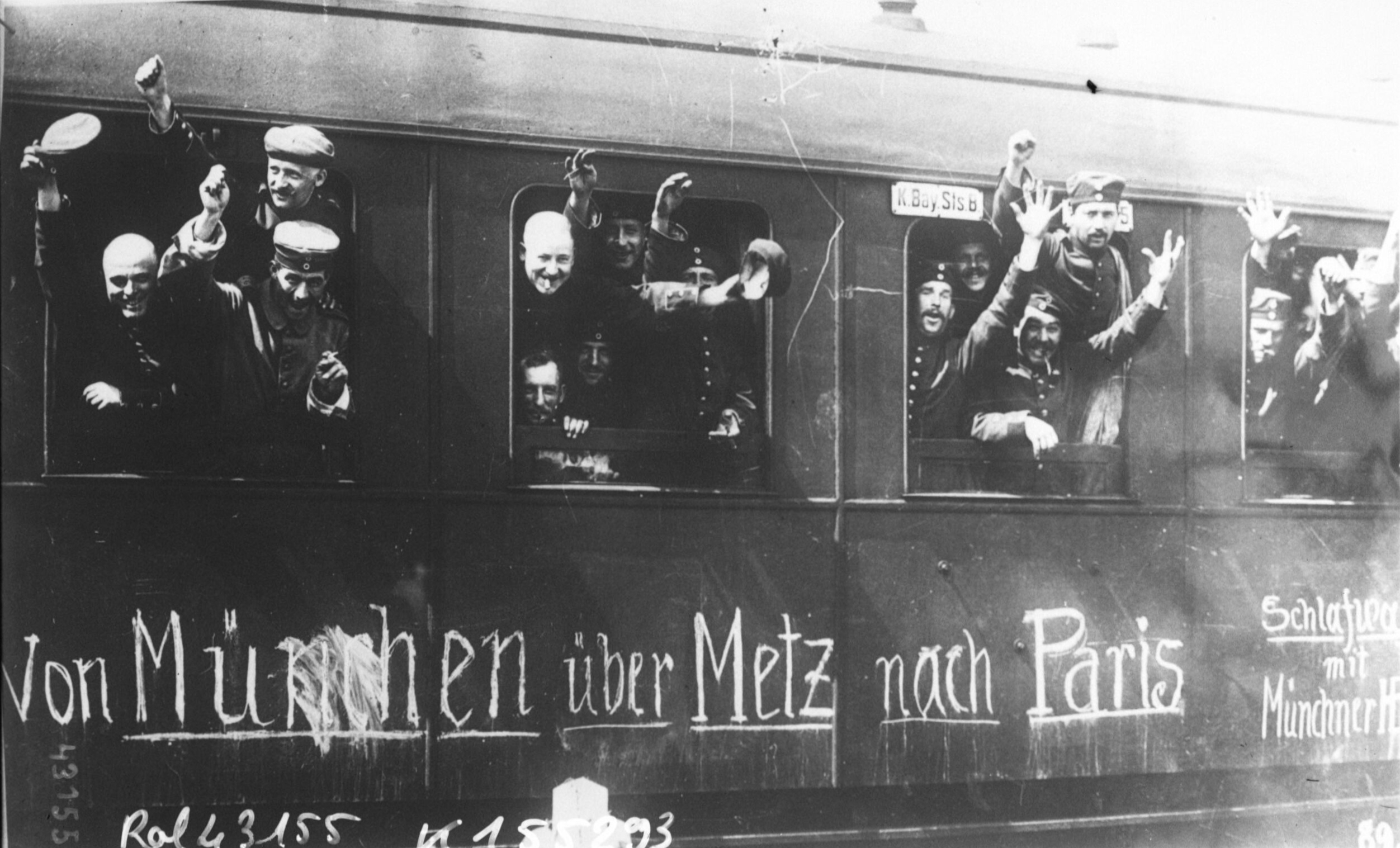
The European model: mobilization of reserve forces through rail networks

The legal frameworks for recruitment were the Regime of Ordinances of 1570, the Royal Charter of 1764 and the Instructions of 10 July 1822. Officers had wanted recruitment reform since the 1840s, and legislators had rhetoric against the system, but there was no reform until the 1870s. A first lottery law proposal was introduced in 1827. In 1834–1835, the lottery proposal was amended to become just a set of bonuses for those who volunteered. Recruitment reform proposals were aborted in 1831, 1839, 1845, 1850, 1858, 1863, and 1866. Partial reforms took place in 1842, 1845, 1847, and 1850, without addressing forced recruitment.

Forced recruitment was far from the European ideal to which the Brazilian elites aspired. Mandatory military service had been a pillar of European armies since the French Revolution, and inspired by it, the 1824 Brazilian Constitution charged everyone with the defense of the state. After the Franco-Prussian War (1870–1871) European countries, with the exception of the United Kingdom, adopted the model of general conscription, service for 1–3 years and a reserve for wartime mobilization, inspired by Prussia, whose conscription system was considered essential to its victory. Nation-states carried out structural reforms, each increasingly controlling their populations. Their armies grew in the "armed peace" of the following decades, based on increasing literacy, industrialization and railroad networks. Mandatory military service would also be a way of instilling the idea of the nation, a "school of nationality" for men of all social backgrounds, making them docile and faithful citizens of the civic religion of patriotism.

Brazil, on the other hand, had a pre-industrial economy and society, with an almost non-existent state for the majority of the population, but the young officialdom demanded change. There was no reserve force, and it was difficult to quickly expand the army in time of need. Soldier shortages were a chronic problem, and officers wanted better-quality manpower. The Paraguayan War evidenced the exhaustion of the model. The much greater demand for soldiers during the war overwhelmed the social arrangement of recruitment, and the conduct of the war was delayed due to the inefficiency of mobilization.

=== 1874 reform attempt ===
Reform of the military service was discussed again from 1866 onwards. The consensus was to end forced recruitment. In its place, Europe offered three models: in the United Kingdom, volunteering for ten years, supplemented by militias, in Prussia, conscription of all eligible men for a short time, followed by enlistment in a reserve, and in France, the draft of some men for seven years of service. Parliamentarians did not accept what they called "conscription", the recruitment of entire classes, as in Prussia. Some in the Liberal Party defended volunteering, while others in the Conservative Party, associated with part of the high officialdom, wanted the French model. The lottery won and was made law in 1874. It was more reminiscent of the French laws of 1818 and 1832, with extensive exemptions, than the universal military service implemented in France after its defeat against Prussia.

The new legislation was Law No. 2,556 of 26 September 1874 and Decree 5,881 of 17 February 1875. It was one of several modernizing reforms passed by the Rio Branco Cabinet. If volunteers were lacking, the first lottery would call up free men aged 19 to 30 for six years of service. Subsequent lotteries, held annually, would choose between 19-year-old men. The rich would have the personal or pecuniary substitution (in peacetime) and the exemptions as ways to avoid service. Still, the number of exemptions declined. To make service more attractive, discipline and hierarchical distinctions were softened. Seen by reformers as an institutional advance, the law was supposed to distribute the military burden more rationally and equitably through a blind lottery. It would end the abuses of forced recruitment, increase the quality of recruits, make military service an honorable duty, and implement a modern reserve system.

To the surprise of its creators, there was opposition from almost all social classes. The equality of the lottery was not seen as fair by the workers benefiting from the protection of patrons, and those who carried out the lottery were not trusted. If, for the poor, the law tightened the burden, for landowners it intensified competition with the military for access to workers. In 1875, when work on the enlistment was due to begin, it was interrupted by crowds of "list rippers" in ten provinces in Southeastern and Northeastern Brazil. The revolt had a peasant character, despite being supported by local elites, and outstanding female participation, with women defending their husbands and families; the new law did not include the traditional exemption for married men. The state backed off, postponing the lottery indefinitely, and the status quo of forced recruitment was maintained.

== The 1908 Sortition Law ==
=== Approval context ===
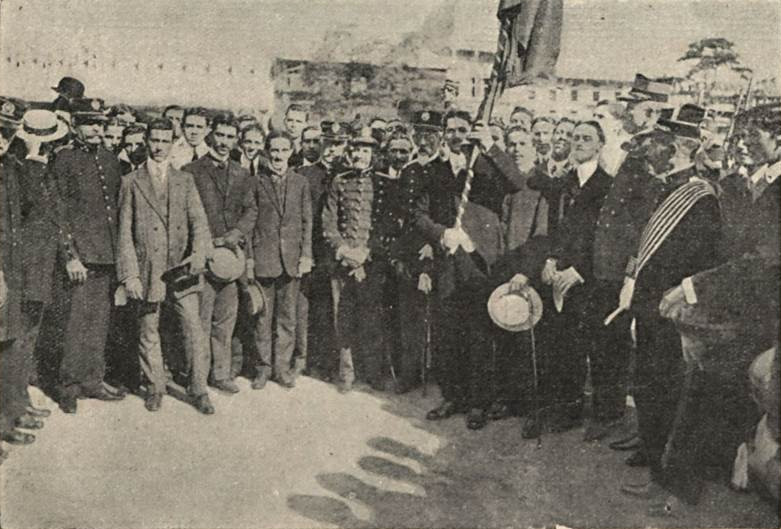
Hermes da Fonseca (in the center) with academic volunteers in 1908. They cheered the law of the lottery

The military ideology after the Proclamation of the Brazilian Republic in 1889 was of the army as the "armed people". The 1891 Brazilian Constitution provided that soldiers in the army and navy would be volunteers, or, failing that, drawn by lottery. Thus, mandatory military service was determined, but its application had not been regulated. The High Command saw compulsory military service as indispensable, and each year Ministry of War reports emphasized its need. It would appear among the military reforms discussed at the beginning of the century by groups of officers such as the Young Turks and carried out in the administrations of war ministers such as Hermes da Fonseca (1906–1909). Reforms were made possible by the internal consolidation of the republic, poor performance in campaigns such as the War of Canudos, and international tensions. In addition to the Acre Issue, there was the rivalry with Argentina, whose relations with Brazil had deteriorated since 1904. The two countries were in a naval arms race and militarist rhetoric was disseminated in their presses. The possibility of war was taken seriously in 1908.

In 1906, federal deputy Alcindo Guanabara presented a new draft law on the lottery. Some parliamentarians questioned its constitutionality, but 15 months later, on 4 January 1908, it was approved. Enlistment boards in the municipalities would annually census all men aged 20 to 28 years. The lotteries would be held annually. Annual batches of recruits would be turned into soldiers and sent to the reserve. The permanent elements of the army would be empowered to instruct this continuous flow, preparing the nation for future wars.

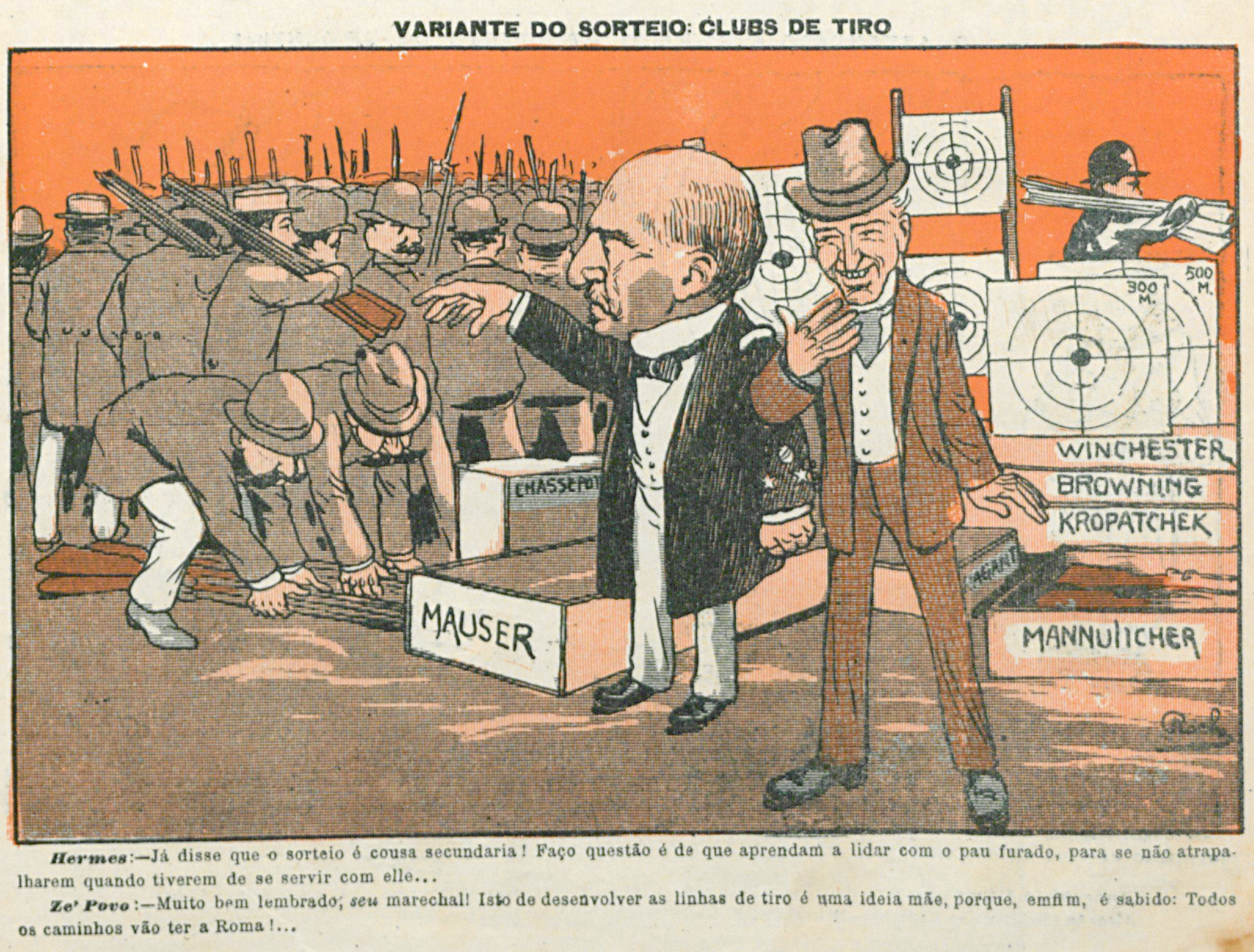
Illustration in O Malho magazine about the proliferation of shooting clubs

Hermes da Fonseca's reforms revolved around mandatory military service. It was needed for the new divisional organization that was intended to be created. The military districts into which Brazil's territory was divided were replaced by thirteen permanent inspection regions, responsible for filling the ranks. Both districts and regions would correspond to army divisions. Only in the "Hermes Reform", in 1908, did the army start to have large permanent units, such as brigades; its structure until then was rudimentary.

The so-called linhas de tiro (shooting ranges), precursors of the Tiros de Guerra, publicized the project and helped propel its approval. Considered more pleasant than the barracks by civilians, they would be a reserve for the army, where youths would receive paramilitary training in weapons and discipline. It was an alternative to military service, taking place in organizations other than traditional ones. In 1906, existing shooting range institutions were merged into the Brazilian Shooting Confederation. The shooting ranges were elitist, and shooters from the Tiros de Guerra, volunteer participants in army maneuvers and students from schools with military training were exempt from the lottery. The Tiros de Guerra were thus a way for the middle and upper classes not to serve in the army. The union of ten shooting clubs of the Federal District in 1908 constituted the first organized reserve of the army. 300 maneuver volunteers were incorporated, some from high society. In the same year, a first civilian college adopted military instruction. Interest in a reserve was also one of the reasons for the army's efforts to control the Public Forces (state-controlled military forces) and the National Guard.

=== Initial failure ===
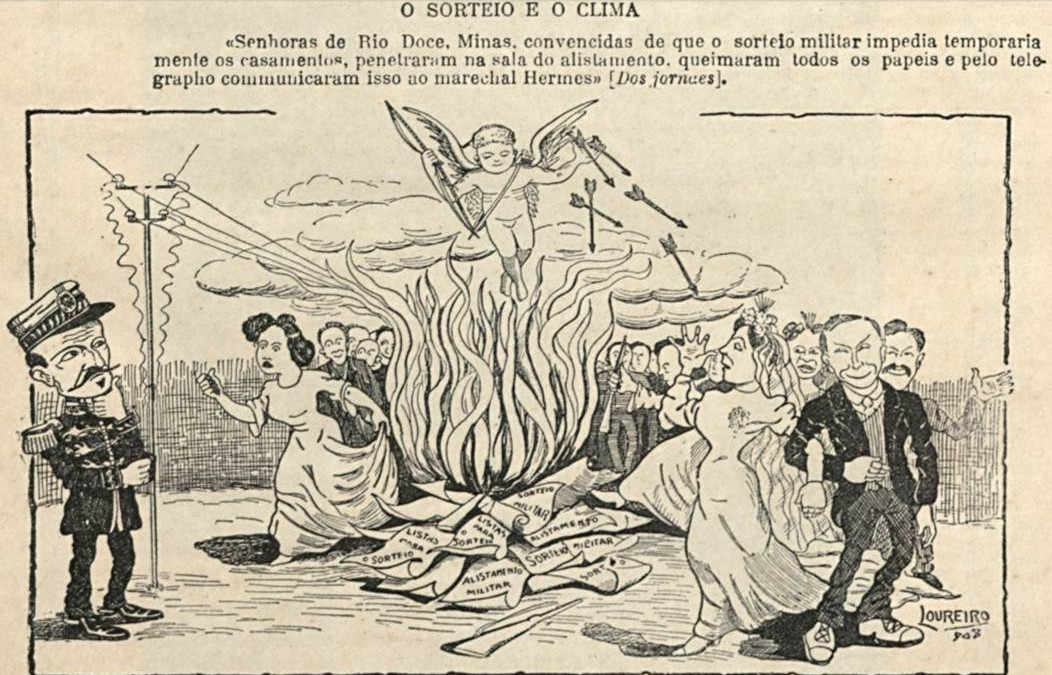
Attack on the enlistment papers by women in the interior of Minas Gerais, O Malho (Note: Caption: "Ladies from Rio Doce, Minas [Gerais], convinced that the military lottery temporarily prevented marriages, entered the enlistment room, burned all the papers and communicated this to marshal Hermes by telegraph".)

Government pressure and enthusiastic support from the middle class allowed the law to be approved. The urban middle class, which made up the officer corps and had an increasing similarity of ideas, intended to strengthen the army against coronelism. Enthusiasm was not unanimous. Supported by officers, intellectuals and capitalists, the law was unwanted among workers. Military service was until then compared to slavery and lower ranks were not valued, although the law sought to change their reputation. The mood of nationalist euphoria was not shared by all of society. Opposition demonstrations took place both in large cities and in the countryside. In Minas Gerais, a powerful state averse to military service, the first attempt at enlistment in 1908 had violent reactions. In Sacramento, 200 women destroyed enlistment records; another attack took place in Uberaba. In Mar de Espanha and Carangola, board members were murdered. In Vila da Abadia there was a mass flight of the population. There were several other resistance incidents. (Note: In 1875, Minas Gerais was the focus of the revolt of the "list rippers" against the first law of the lottery. (Mendes 1999, p. 278))

After the law was passed, budget cuts reduced the army's strength to a level staffed only with volunteers, and there was no lottery. Enlistment boards were put in place for the future lottery, but slowly. In Minas Gerais, only ten of the 178 municipalities had boards in 1912. With incomplete lists, it was not possible to carry out the lottery. With the candidacy of marshal Hermes da Fonseca in the 1910 presidential election and the opposition of the Civilist Campaign, the enthusiasm of the civilian elite for the lottery waned. The Sortition Law was associated with the marshal. Hermes won the election, but in his tenure (1910–1914) the Salvation Policy discredited the army, further delaying mandatory military service. An initial surge of enthusiasm for shooting societies was lost because the law was not applied, and membership only began to grow again after 1916. Personnel demand continued to be met by volunteering and forced recruitment until 1916.

== The law's controversies ==
=== Support ===
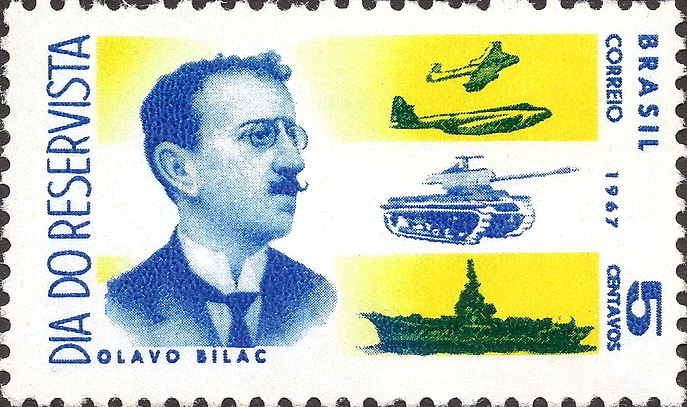
1967 stamp commemorating Olavo Bilac's contribution to mandatory military service

The officers' consensus on the law was that it should fill in the gaps in the ranks, generalize military training, and form a deployable reserve. Armies throughout South America were undergoing modernizations, and Brazilian officers looked with concern at their country's backwardness. Chile and Argentina had already adopted compulsory military service in 1900 and 1901, respectively. In the same period (1900–1912) it was also adopted by Ecuador, Colombia, Bolivia and Peru. In the navy, the problem of lack of personnel had already been remedied with the old instruments; there was a shortage of enlisted men until the end of the 1900s, but by 1914 94% of the National Marine Corps personnel ranks had been filled.

While the military usefulness of conscription was clear, ideological perspectives on it were diverse, and intellectuals were more ambitious than officers. It was associated with the contemporary idea of modernity and rationality, transforming the nation in the likes of countries considered more advanced; "an example, a reference for the literate avant-gardes of the time, a symbol of modernity, civilization and progress". Civilian and military republican leaders saw the possibility of modernizing the bureaucratic apparatus of the state and breaking the local clientelism that made recruitment difficult. These local powers (rural coronelism) intimidated voters with the threat of impressment, and thus they opposed the lottery.

Intellectuals, notably Olavo Bilac, saw an educational and disciplining potential of compulsory military service on the masses. The Armed Forces would serve as an alternative to the limited-reach education system in transforming the population, which they saw as ignorant, manipulated and lacking a sense of nationality. The recruits would leave the barracks as citizens instilled with the values of intellectuals. This "civilizing mission" would be conducted by the officers, who would become "civic priests", teachers of the soldiers-students. Bilac stressed that militarization would be against an external invader, not offensive, and the "citizen soldier" would be a militarized civilian and not a member of a military caste interfering in politics. The scope of the lottery would be universal, giving a sense of civic and national unity to countrymen from the interior and children of former slaves and immigrants. Thus, it would be a way of consolidating the Brazilian nation-state. If, on the one hand, the disciplinary effect would be for the lower class, on the other hand middle and upper classes were also expected to serve, and Bilac even scandalized them with his insistence on the immediate application of the law. During the law's discussion, Alcindo Guanabara spoke that the lottery would be for all social classes, and the opposition came from the bourgeoisie that did not want their children to serve. For him, "the new army will not be a prison, a place of torture, it will not be a branch of the Dantean Inferno". (Note: "Inferno dantesco", in Guanabara's speech, refers to the interior of a slave ship in an anti-slavery poem by Castro Alves, O Navio Negreiro.) According to Olavo Bilac:

What is generalized military service? It is the complete triumph of democracy; the leveling of classes, the school of order, discipline, cohesion; the laboratory of self-dignity and patriotism. It is compulsory primary education; it is compulsory civic education; it is obligatory cleanliness, obligatory hygiene, obligatory muscular and psychic regeneration.

=== Criticism ===
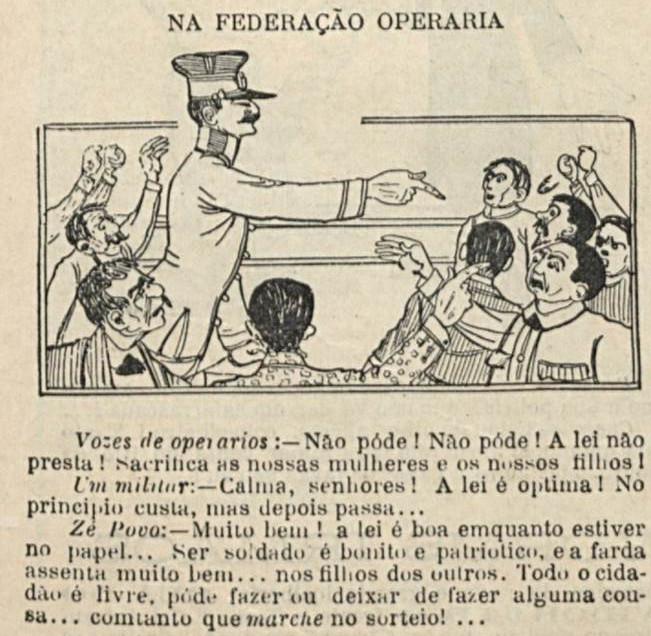
Illustration in O Malho about workers' opposition to the law (Note: The caption reads: "Voices of workers - No! No! The law sucks! It sacrifices our women and our children! Military officer - Calm down, gentlemen! The law is great! It hurts at first, but then it passes... Folk Joe: Fine! The law is good as long as it's on paper... being a soldier is nice and patriotic and the uniform fits very well... on other people's children. Every citizen is free, he can do or not do something... as long as he participates in the lottery!...)

Alberto Torres, like Olavo Bilac, an influential intellectual for the military, was against compulsory military service. For Torres, military training would not transmit civic virtues; soldiers would only be virtuous if they had been virtuous before; "civic character, morality, feelings of altruism and sympathy have only found adulteration in the barracks until today. The good soldier brings them from home and from the public squares to the barracks. The barracks, not being able to create such qualities, does not, therefore, make good soldiers for our time: it makes praetorians (...)" Instead, compulsory military service would be undemocratic, transforming permanent officers into a caste above the people and engaged in politics. As a ruralist, Torres considered a civic militia, that is, the National Guard, to be the most democratic alternative.

The newspapers Correio da Manhã, O Século and Gazeta de Notícias called the law bellicose and anti-individualist. The satirical magazine O Malho published numerous criticisms and ironies. For the Associação dos Empregados no Comercio do Rio de Janeiro (AECRJ), the law violated liberal principles and individual liberties in regards to the State and disorganized the working classes. The Positivist Apostolate of Brazil, based on the theories of Auguste Comte, saw no future for militarization in social evolution. The civic discourse of Bilac and his supporters was satirized by the popular poet Leandro Gomes de Barros. According to Barros' poem O sorteio militar, from 1906, everyone would be drafted — priests, the elderly, the blind, the maimed, the insane and even the dead — but not the elite.

The main opposition to the lottery, however, came from the labor movement. The First Brazilian Workers' Congress, in 1906, had already passed an anti-militarist resolution. Reception to the new law was hostile in 1908; for the workers' representatives, among them anarchist leaders, militarism and war were only in the interests of capitalists. The Brazilian Workers Confederation had an anti-militarist and anti-capitalist discourse in its demonstrations and in its newspaper A Voz do Trabalhador, calling for resistance to the law. In January 1908 the Brazilian Antimilitarist League was founded. According to its program, the army "serves to keep the working class in its place, and serves as a strikebreaker", "[it] represents a barbaric past, and for this reason it opposes the ideals of individual freedom, freedom of choice of professions and respect for the person"; "The Fatherland, in the name of which the army is created to defend, does not represent the interests of all citizens, but only that of the capitalists", and the lottery "is the return of slavery and is unconstitutional". Anarchist opposition to the law was internationalist; Brazilian antimilitarists were articulated with similar movements in Argentina, both opposed to conscription and war between the two countries. In 1915, the International Peace Congress was held in Rio de Janeiro. Repressed by the authorities, the labor movement failed to prevent the implementation of the law.

One of the central controversies, first raised by the workers, was the effect of compulsory military service on the family. For conscription opponents, men would not be able to start a family and mothers would lose their children to the degrading environment of the barracks; the manifesto of the Antimilitarist League warned mothers that the Armed Forces were dens of criminals and their children would be treated the same as them. Defenders reacted by describing the barracks as an extension of the family. For many Brazilian men, military service did not represent virility but a threat to their masculinity. In the dark humor of the time, the conscripts were mocked as "cuckolds". Like mandatory vaccination, which had resulted in the Vaccine Revolt in 1904, mandatory military service was seen as a violation of domestic privacy. In both cases, the opponents of the state were similar—trade unionists, Jacobins (radical republicans), orthodox positivists, monarchists and some influential politicians. In turn, lottery advocates used the rhetoric of hygiene, which was persuasive as prophylaxis was eradicating yellow fever, smallpox and other diseases in cities.

Another point, raised by the AECRJ and the Antimilitarist League, was that military service would privilege immigrants over Brazilians in the labor market. However, the large number of immigrants in the factories drove precisely the unions and leagues against compulsory military service. For its defenders, the children of immigrants would be one of the groups to be integrated into the national community through the service.

== The first lottery ==
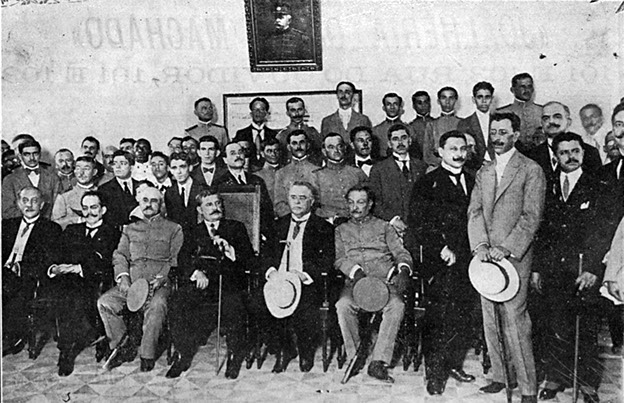
Authorities in the first lottery in 1916. President Venceslau Brás is fourth from left to right (seated)

The outbreak of the First World War (1914–1918), with the immense material mobilization and destruction suffered by the belligerent countries, impressed Brazilian observers and motivated the discussion on national defense, including a new impetus to the effort to implement the Sortition Law. In the era of total war, in which entire populations were mobilized, the Brazilian model was obsolete.

The formation of a reserve force was a cause shared by the editors of the periodical A Defesa Nacional and general José Caetano de Faria, Minister of War during the government of Venceslau Brás. In his order of battle reform, Faria replaced the Hermes Reform brigades with army divisions capable of incorporating reservists without creating new units. By the High Command's idea, a public relations campaign was launched in favor of the lottery, with the support of president Venceslau Brás and with Olavo Bilac as its spokesperson. In his "nationalist apostolate" from 1915 to 1916, Bilac lectured to students, intellectuals and military officers in São Paulo, Rio de Janeiro, Belo Horizonte, Curitiba and Porto Alegre. He joined other intellectuals and military and business people in the National Defense League, which formulated and disseminated an ideology of national defense. The common interest was the conservative modernization of the Brazilian State through political centralization, compulsory military service and primary education.

The lottery continued to receive criticism in Congress, and general Gabino Besouro was stripped of his commands in the 5th Military Region and the 3rd Army Division, in Rio de Janeiro, for publicly declaring that the lottery was illegal and the army would not be able to receive the "avalanche" of conscripts. On the other hand, the population was more concerned about public health and the assimilation of immigrants, issues associated with mandatory military service. Political opponents were no longer an obstruction: senator Ruy Barbosa was enthusiastic about Brazil's entry in World War I, and senator Pinheiro Machado, leader of a coalition of rural colonels, was assassinated in 1915. The press began to write in favor of the lottery.

Finally, on 10 December 1916, almost nine years after the law was passed, the first lottery was held at the Army Headquarters in a ceremony open to the public, with the presence of the President of the Republic, the Minister of War, Olavo Bilac and other authorities. By rotating a globe, with numbered balls, 152 names were drawn for the first group. The Supreme Federal Court denied some requests for habeas corpus, thus ruling on the constitutionality of the law. The Catholic Church also expressed its approval.

== Summoned and unsubmissive men ==
The lottery underpinned the physical expansion of the army. The force had 18,000 men in 1915, within the 15,000 to 20,000 men range that it had fluctuated in the previous century since the 1830s. As the cost of transporting soldiers over long distances was high, training took place in the soldiers' home regions, (Note: The Federal District and Rio Grande do Sul, where the largest garrisons were located, received conscripts from abroad so as not to overburden the local populations. (McCann 2009, p. 300) Conscripts from western São Paulo are called to service in Mato Grosso since the 1920s. (Ferreira 2014, p. 275)) and thus, a first wave of expansion, at the time of the country's entry into World War I, sought greater geographical extension. In order to house more and more people drawn and be able to summon reservists, a major program to build barracks began during the administration of Pandiá Calógeras (1919–1922) in the Ministry of War. Manpower growth kept its momentum. According to Minister of War Eurico Gaspar Dutra, the force reached 50 thousand men in 1930 and 93 thousand in 1940. Even so, Brazil still had a low number of soldiers per capita.

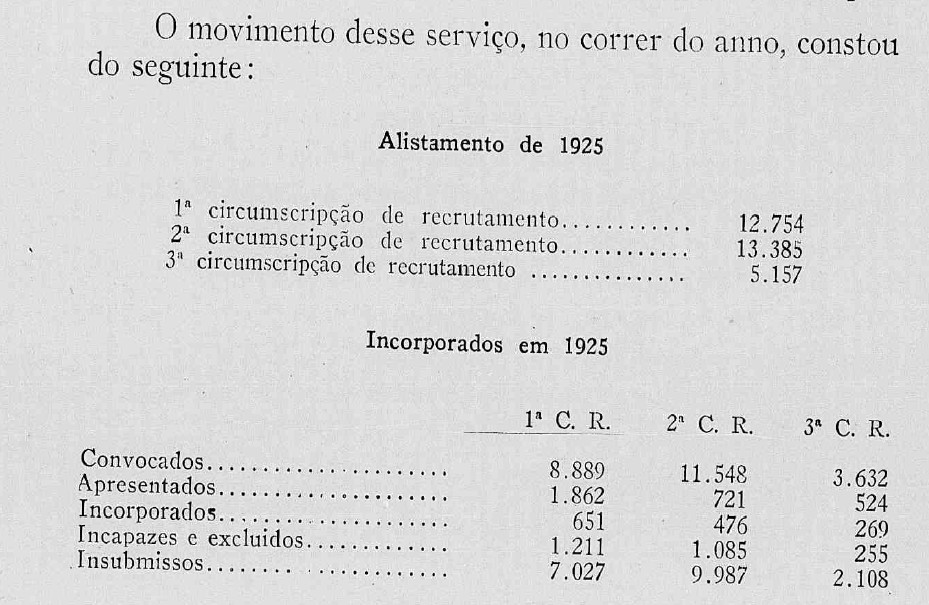
The high proportion of unsubmissives in the Ministry of War's report for 1925

The expansion took place despite the system not working exactly as intended. Its proponents felt failure. A huge number of unsubmissive men did not respond to the summons. In 1925, 82% of those summoned by the 1st Military Region did not attend, and of the remaining, 17% were physically incapable. Only 6% of those summoned were used. Commercial and industrial institutions did not provide lists of employees. Birth and death records were deficient, and some of those called for service did not even know it; notification through the Post Office was flawed. In that case, it was normal to be acquitted in court. Punishing the unyielding was difficult. Many did not attend due to refusal. Recruitment continued to be conducted arbitrarily, and it was used as a weapon in political struggles in the countryside, as the local recruitment boards were headed by the presidents of the municipal councils. Poor hygiene and food conditions, low salaries and the weakness of the army's infrastructure kept the population's rejection to military service. Such conditions spawned anti-militarist reservists. The population's passive resistance increased in the mid-1920s, when the army was discredited by the revolts of the tenentes. In 1928, half of the enlisted men were volunteers, not drawn by lottery.

Through the new system, "the selection of those who entered became more judicious. Entry of ex-convicts, beggars, vagrants, and including illiterates in the ranks was barred. The higher the social origin of conscripts, the better for the selectors". The army's modernization required a higher technical level of the enlisted men. They served closer to home and were more urban than the average population, as civil registration was less complete in rural areas. In the medical records of 1922–1923 the recruits were mostly agricultural workers, factory workers and trade employees. They were uneducated, but in the 1930s and 1940s only about 30% were illiterate, against 51.6% of the total population in the 1940 census. Due to the country's sanitary state, many were physically unfit. Physical punishment, considered inadmissible for young men drawn, was suppressed, but violence did not completely disappear from the barracks.

Contrary to what advocates of compulsory military service expected, there was no socioeconomic leveling and the soldiers continued to be of lower classes. Middle- and upper-class children evaded service through exemptions from powerful local patrons, shooting societies, volunteering in army maneuvers, schools with military training, and preparatory courses for reserve officers. With good connections, a healthy young man could be considered unfit for service on physical examination.

== Developments in legislation ==
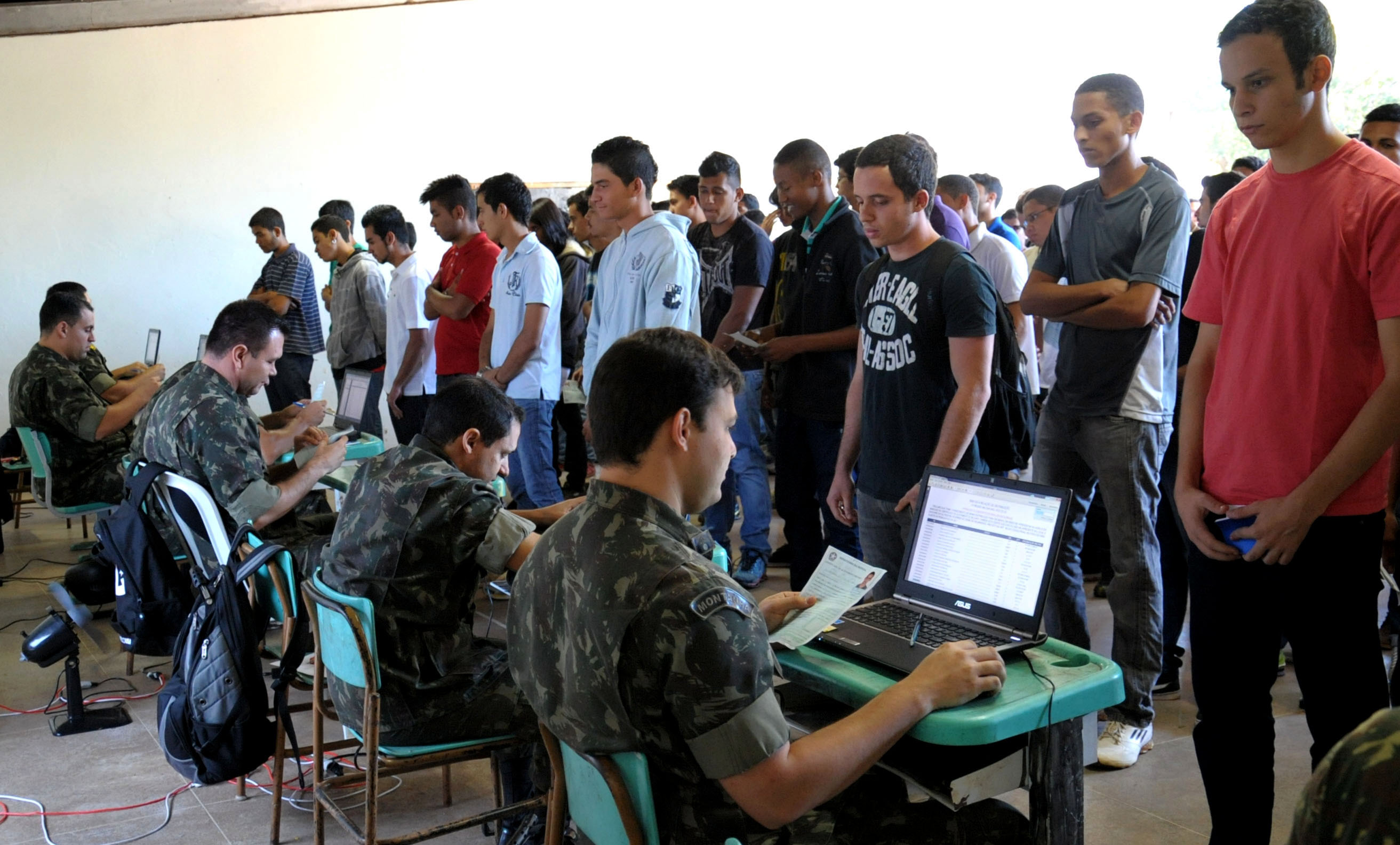
Young men reporting for military enlistment in 2014

New legislation later emerged for military service. The 1908 law was amended in 1918, a regulation was created by decree in 1923, and a new law on military service was passed in 1939. Despite patriotic appeals, only punitive measures resolved insubmission. A 1933 decree required a certificate of military service for holding public office. The requirement for this document became universal, and new legal provisions emerged to enforce the lottery. From 1945 onwards, all young men had the obligation to present themselves, under penalty of not being able to obtain an identity card or passport, hold public office or "claim the recognition of any right, favor or prerogative based on labor laws".

Even in 1940, the minister of War considered the lottery indispensable, as there was not enough patriotic will to serve. In addition to punitive measures, real improvements in working conditions and the advance of official rhetoric slowly dispelled the idea that military service was a punishment. Desertion and violent criminality in the ranks declined after 1916. During World War II, enlisted personnel numbers grew to 153,158 in 1944; the lottery proved capable of mobilizing a large force. The Brazilian Expeditionary Force (1943–1945) was meant to be a volunteer force. As volunteers were insufficient, it was complemented with a selection of the best possible conscripts. The prestige of the pracinhas, as the soldiers of Expeditionary Force were called, confirmed the change in soldiers' reputation.

The lottery had been in force from 1916 to 1945; from then on, the recruitment system became the general convoking of the class, still in force in the 21st century. All the class (citizens born in a given year) attends the recruitment process, and the authorities choose from among them the young men who will serve. The system is basically the same as in force since 1916. However, in the 1950s recruitment was already becoming more selective, occurring in only a quarter of the municipalities, as the army became more technical. In the 21st century, many more young men are enlisted than the barracks incorporate. In 2009, there were 1.6 million enlisted men for the 80,000 incorporated into the Armed Forces.

== Consequences ==
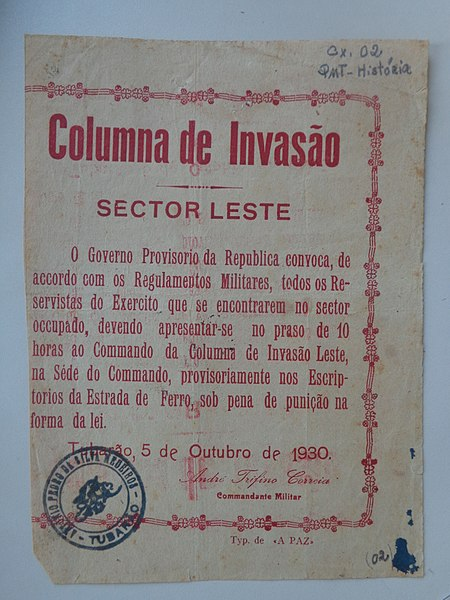
Calling up of reservists during the Revolution of 1930

=== For the military career ===
Mandatory military service changed the paradigm of a professional army to that of a "nation in arms". The professional soldier (only professional in the sense that he stayed many years in the barracks) was no longer desired. Until then, soldiers served until expulsion or end of career. The term of service was three years in 1891, but soldiers could renew their re-engagement for up to 20 years of service. Incorporated soldiers were of different ages and arrived in small numbers throughout the year. NCOs (corporals, sergeants, and warrant officers) came from the ranks of soldiers, and some of the officers were soldiers that had been promoted.

With the lottery, personnel were divided into a permanent element, consisting mainly of career officers and secondarily of permanent praças (soldiers and NCOs), and a variable one of enlisted men who returned to civilian life after a short period of service. Recruits were young and arrived simultaneously, facilitating socialization into the military. Volunteers or draftees served for periods of two years, after which they could then re-engage under certain conditions, and remained in the reserve after serving on active duty. The figure of the professional soldier did not disappear completely, as the army needed a core of experienced soldiers and a new figure emerged, the instructor sergeant. The National Guard, a vestige of a military service separate from the army, was abolished in 1918 as a logical consequence of universal conscription. Parallel to the concept of the "nation in arms", there was the elitist project of professionalizing the officer corps. The access of enlisted men to the officership was gradually reduced, especially during the Estado Novo.

=== For the institution ===
The Sortition Law was one of the milestones in the transformation of the Brazilian Army at the beginning of the Republic, with important institutional and political effects. For historian José Murilo de Carvalho, universal conscription was the most important of the various facets of "the army's intense struggle to become a national organization capable of effectively planning and executing a defense policy in its broadest sense" during the First Brazilian Republic. Along with other measures, such as the training of reserve officers (in which the upper class participated), there was a new model of military organization. The army was no longer closed in on itself, taking in some recruits from the outside without returning them to civilian life, but it now had multiple channels of entry and exit and could influence society by training and socializing the reservists. The rebel tenentes of the 1920s gained a sociological justification for the "citizen-soldier" idea, as they could now argue that the force represented the people. The "Party in Uniform" became stronger and more engaged in politics and had a greater ability to impose its ideology on society.

External image
- "Se não és reservista, ainda não és brasileiro" (If you are not a reservist, you are not Brazilian yet) (p. 195). Posters used in publicizing the 1939 Military Service Act.

The army's relationship with society was altered, introducing it to the private sphere of the family and to the most remote parts of Brazil. The development of its bureaucratic structure from the late 1910s onwards allowed it to reach individuals hitherto invisible to the State. The numbers grew gradually, causing "a slow and silent process of accumulation of political capital by the army and, by extension, the central power, to the detriment of local and regional plutocracies". At the national level, this ended up allowing the Estado Novo. The State took the place of local coronéis as patron of the honorable poor. The inclusion of a greater proportion of the population in the military legitimized the social programs and the more inclusive electoral politics of populism, at the same time as the military gained sufficient strength to exercise authoritarian power.

At the time of its implementation, a more restricted lottery was expected for the navy, reaching, in addition to navy schools, the Merchant Navy, as naval service required experience in the area. In practice, the navy and the Brazilian Air Force, created in 1941, took decades to take advantage of the conscription. At the turn of the 21st century, the proportion of conscripts in the navy and air force was much lower than in the army.

The civic mission of mandatory military service was embraced throughout the century by officers as one of the functions of the institution. At the end of the 20th century and the beginning of the 21st century, in view of the worldwide trend towards the adoption of voluntary military service, which occurred even in neighboring countries such as Argentina, the Brazilian Army gradually reduced its dependence on conscripts and tried to increase its core base, i.e. , soldiers who choose to remain for more than a year. Even so, the consensus in the Brazilian government remained in favor of conscription. The National Defense Strategy, approved in 2008, maintained the definition of mandatory military service as a leveler of social classes, even though it did not correspond to the reality of recruitment, even more so with the very low percentages of incorporation. The arguments used in its defense are the same ones formulated at the time of the Sortition Law, a century before, such as the education of the masses and the "nation in arms". The pedagogical procedures in the training of recruits are in accordance with what Olavo Bilac, the Young Turks and the National Defense League intended, seeking to mold a "docile, politically neutral body, however, orderly, productive and patriotic".

== See also ==
- Reorganization of the Brazilian Army in the Old Republic
- Draft lottery in the United States
- Voluntários da Pátria
