= Voluntários da Pátria =

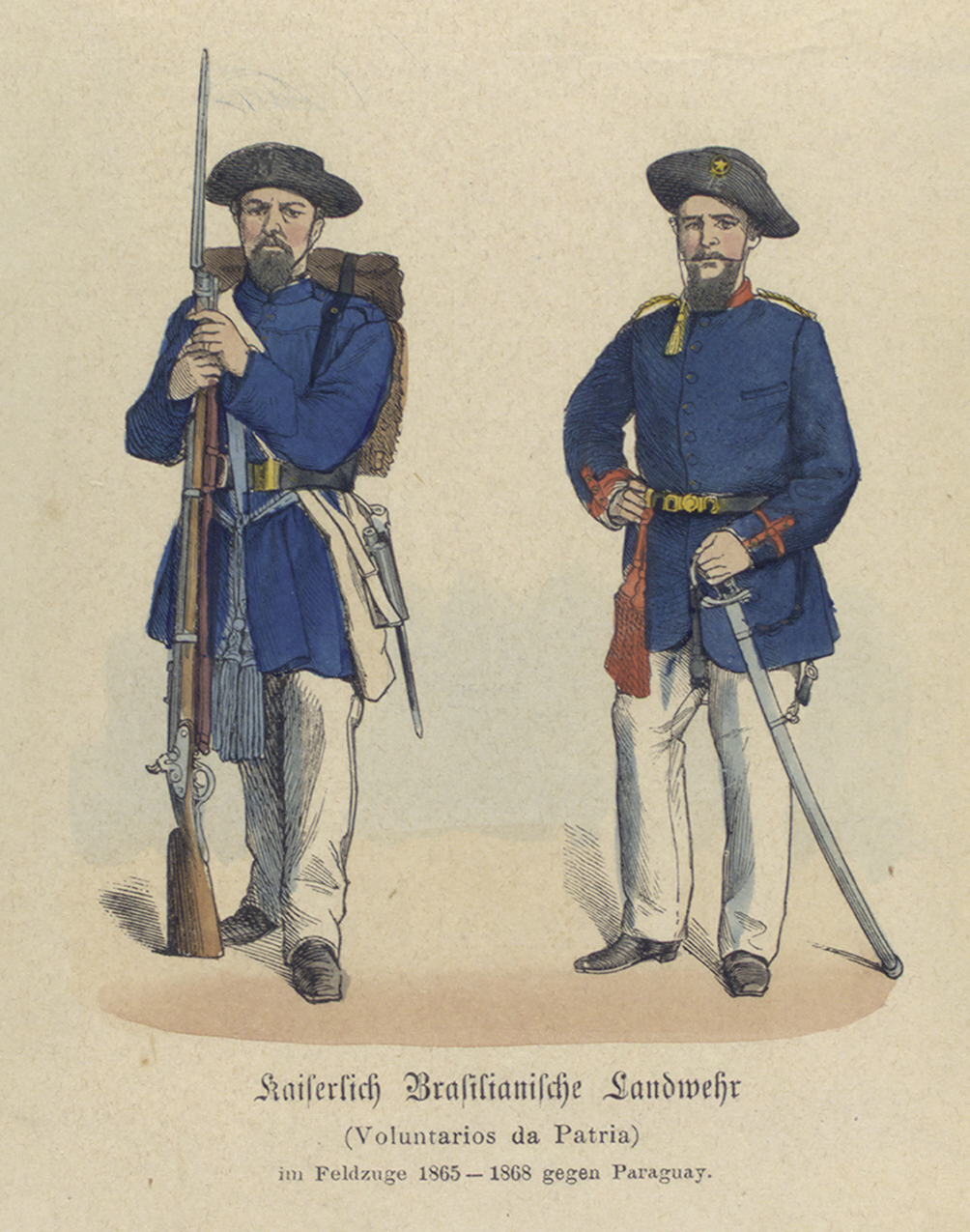
- Active: 1865–1870
- Country: Empire of Brazil
- Branch: Imperial Brazilian Army
- Size: 54,992
- Engagements: Paraguayan War

Voluntários da Pátria (English: Homeland Volunteers), was the name given to the volunteer military units created on 7 January 1865 by decree of the Empire of Brazil to fight in the Paraguayan War with which the imperial government sought to strengthen the Imperial Brazilian Army.

== Background ==
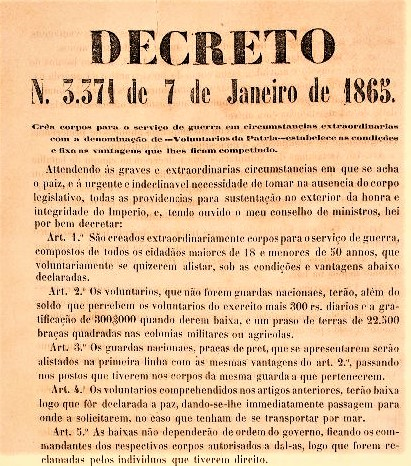
Imperial Decree No. 3,371 that created the volunteer corps

The Imperial Brazilian Army was, at the beginning of the Paraguayan War, very small and dispersed throughout all of Brazil. Service in the army was seen as a punishment, given the harsh conditions the soldiers found themselves in. The army also lacked prestige, its ranks were filled with men who were seen as undesirables by the society of the time. The Marquis of Caxias wrote to the Minister of War, the Marquis of Paranaguá, in reference to the state of the army prior to the war, that:

"Due to a set of deplorable circumstances, our army always had in its ranks large quantities of men that society repudiated for their terrible qualities".

Deprived of war resources, without a sufficiently numerous and trained army and unable to adequately retaliate for the Paraguayan offense received after the invasion of Mato Grosso in December 1864 (before formal declaration of war, which happened on 13 December 1864), emperor Pedro II issued the Decree No. 3,371 on 7 January 1865; This decree, appealing to the patriotic feelings of the Brazilian people, created military corps for the service of war, with the denomination of Voluntários da Pátria.

The emperor soon left for the city of Uruguaiana, which was occupied by Paraguayan forces and besieged by the allied army, on September 11. He disembarked in Rio Grande do Sul and continued from there by land. The journey was carried out by horse and cart, and at night the emperor slept in a field tent. In Uruguaiana, he presented himself at the army camp as the country's first volunteer, using this political strategy to serve as an example both to the military stationed there and to the rest of Brazil.

== Recruitment ==
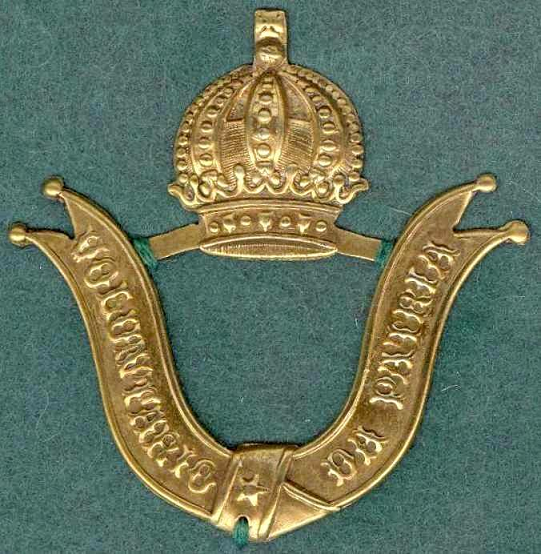
Volunteer badge, worn in the left arm

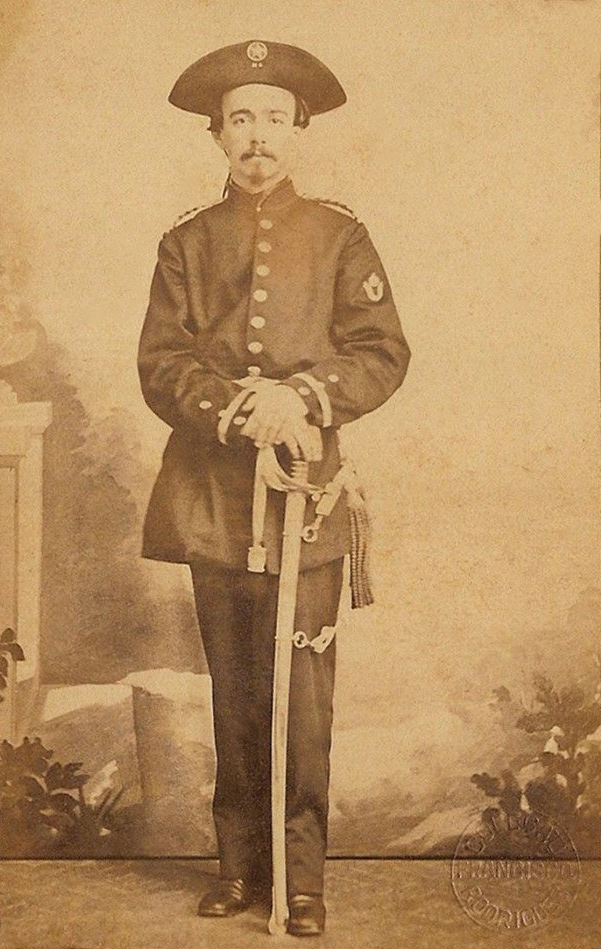
A volunteer soldier with the badge on his left arm

Initially formed to take advantage of the volunteering fervour that took hold in Brazil following the beginning of the war, it brought together volunteers who enlisted spontaneously. Any citizen between 18 and 50 years old was eligible for enlistment. The imperial government guaranteed several advantages to the volunteers, such as a prize of three hundred thousand réis upon finishing service; plots of land with 22,500 fathoms (49,500 square metres) in military or agricultural colonies; preference in public jobs; honorary officer ranks; freedom to slaves; assistance to orphans, widows and the war maimed.

Contrary to the National Guard, whose force, controlled by the local elites, was reluctant to go to war, there was great patriotic enthusiasm among the common people to fill the ranks of the corps of Voluntários da Pátria. The volunteers comprised a broad spectrum of social classes. After the enlistment of ten thousand volunteers, the government deemed it was enough and suspended recruitment in the National Guard. In the province of Bahia, the number of volunteers was such that the government ordered the refusal of new ones, but struggled to enforce it due to the pressure exerted by the volunteers. Some volunteers saw the financial benefits offered by the government as a way of improving their condition while others spontaneously gave up the benefits, proving their true volunteer intentions.

As the war continued on for more than expected and with the waning of popular enthusiasm, the imperial government began forced recruitment, demanding quotas of volunteers from the presidents of the provinces, which they should recruit. On the other hand, there were several ways to escape recruitment: those who had possessions donated resources, equipment, slaves and employees to fight in their place; those of lesser possessions enlisted their relatives, children, nephews or associates; to the dispossessed the only way to escape recruitment was desertion. Indigenous peoples from several provinces also participated in the war.

Recruitment also took a political stance. With the dispute in the government for the conduction of the war between the liberals of the ruling Liberal Party and the conservatives, represented by Zacarias de Góis e Vasconcelos and the Marquis of Caxias, respectively, the local governments in the provinces began to recruit their political enemies to send to war. The liberal cabinet eventually fell and the conservatives got back to power with the rise of the Viscount of Itaboraí to the office of prime minister.

The use of slaves to fight on behalf of their owners became common practice. However, the number of slaves and freed slaves sent to war never exceeded 10% of the total number of soldiers. In addition, patriotic societies, convents and the government began to buy slaves to fight in the war. The empire then began to promise manumission to the slaves who presented themselves for war. This caused slaves to flee alone or in groups from the plantations, and to present themselves to recruiters with false names in order to mislead their masters, even with the government turning a blind eye. Emperor Pedro II set an example, freeing all slaves from imperial farms (such as the Imperial Farm of Santa Cruz) to fight in the war.

=== Origin of the volunteers ===
Origin	Number
Amazonas	367
Pará	2,084
Maranhão	2,385
Piauí	1,420
Ceará	2,037
Rio Grande do Norte	814
Paraíba	1,472
Pernambuco	5,793
Alagoas	1,591
Sergipe	1,405
Bahia	9,164
Minas Gerais	2,158
Espírito Santo	625
Rio de Janeiro	4,666
Court (Note: The Neutral Municipality.)	7,128
São Paulo	4,824
Paraná	613
Santa Catarina	1,103
Rio Grande do Sul	3,200
Goiás	275
Mato Grosso	1,417
Montevideo	450
Total:	54,992

== Casualties ==
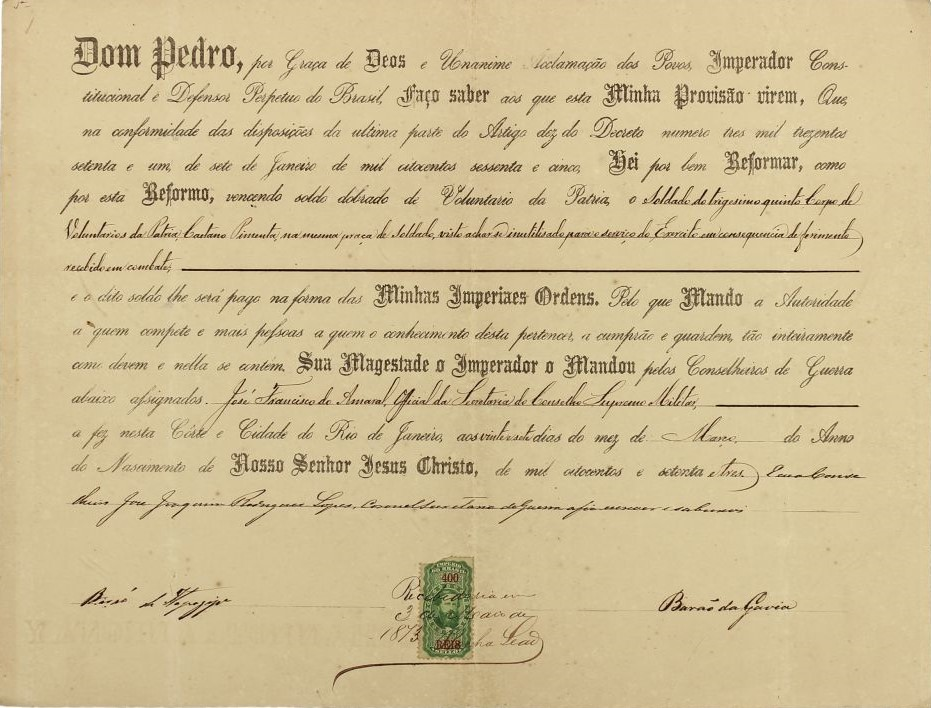
Document, dated 1873, of compensation for wounded in combat

Brazilian losses due to deaths, injuries, illnesses and disability killed many of the volunteers. Out of the 57 volunteer corps that were formed and sent to war, only 14 remained. For war maimed people who had no resources for their own subsistence, the government created the Asylum for the Invalides of the Homeland, inaugurated on 29 July 1868, on the Bom Jesus da Coluna island, in Guanabara Bay. There they remained under the care of the government, surviving on the resources raised during the war by the Commercial Association of Rio de Janeiro, but far from the eyes of the population.

Once the war was over, the return of the few remaining volunteer corps began. The first ones formed a brigade under the command of Faria Rocha, from Bahia, who was received with great effusion by the emperor, making his triumphal march through the Primeiro de Março street, formerly Rua Direita, in the city of Rio de Janeiro.

== Armament ==
From 1864 to 1870 the main infantry armament employed by the Imperial Army were percussion guns, both rifles and carbines with rifled barrels and 14.8 or 14.6mm caliber ammunition, namely the Minié system. A smaller number of other guns were also used, these included breechloading Dreyse guns, 14.6mm Spencer rifles and Enfield guns. Outdated weapons, although in a lesser number, were still used, especially by the corps of Voluntários da Pátria, which at the beginning of the war were still equipped with flintlock guns with smoothbore barrels, before receiving modern armament.

== Unit structure ==
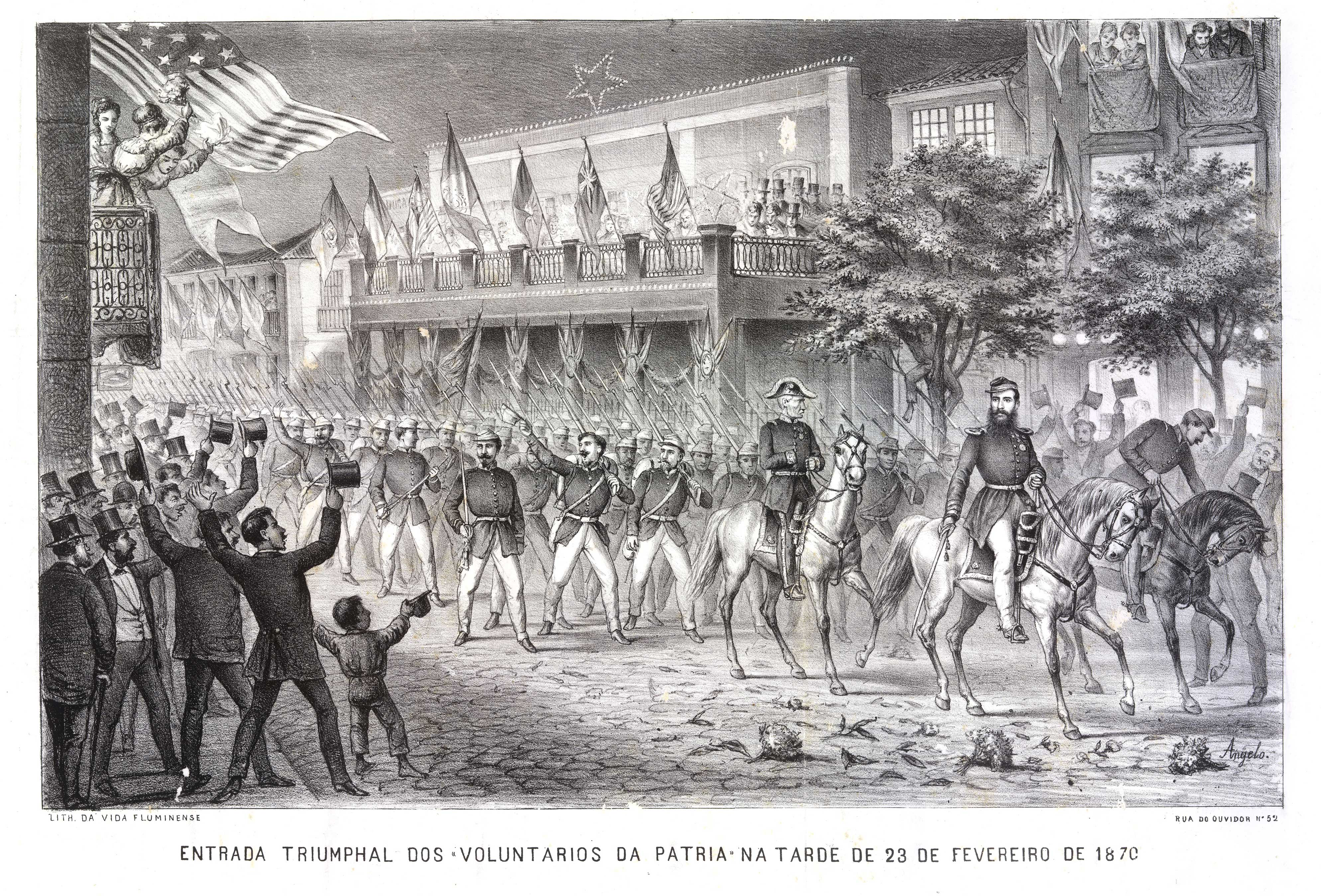
Triumphal entry of the volunteers on the afternoon of 23 February 1870, lithography by Angelo Agostini

Though in practice varying in the total number of soldiers, each Volunteer Corps was generally made up of:

Commander (lieutenant colonel)

High staff

- 1 supervisor (major) - sub commander;
- 1 assistant (captain) - responsible for the personnel;
- 1 quartermaster (captain) - responsible for the material;
- 1 secretary (lieutenant) - assistant and writer.

Lower staff

- 1 assistant sergeant - assistant to the assistant captain (sergeant);
- 1 quartermaster sergeant - assistant to the quartermaster captain (warehouse);
- 1 rifle sergeant - gunsmith;
- 1 sergeant crown - carpenter;
- 1 major cornet sergeant - responsible for the musicians;

Companies

Eight companies, each containing:

- 1 captain - company commander;
- 1 lieutenant - company sub commander;
- 2 ensign - platoon commanders;
- 1 first sergeant - assistant to the company commander;
- 2 second sergeants - auxiliaries of platoon commanders;
- 1 furriel;
- 8 corporals;
- 8 lance corporals;
- 2 buglers;
- 78 soldiers.

== See also ==
- Blood tax (Brazil)
