= Imperial Brazilian Army =

1822–1889 land warfare branch of the Brazilian military

- Exército Imperial Brasileiro
- Imperial Army Coat of Arms

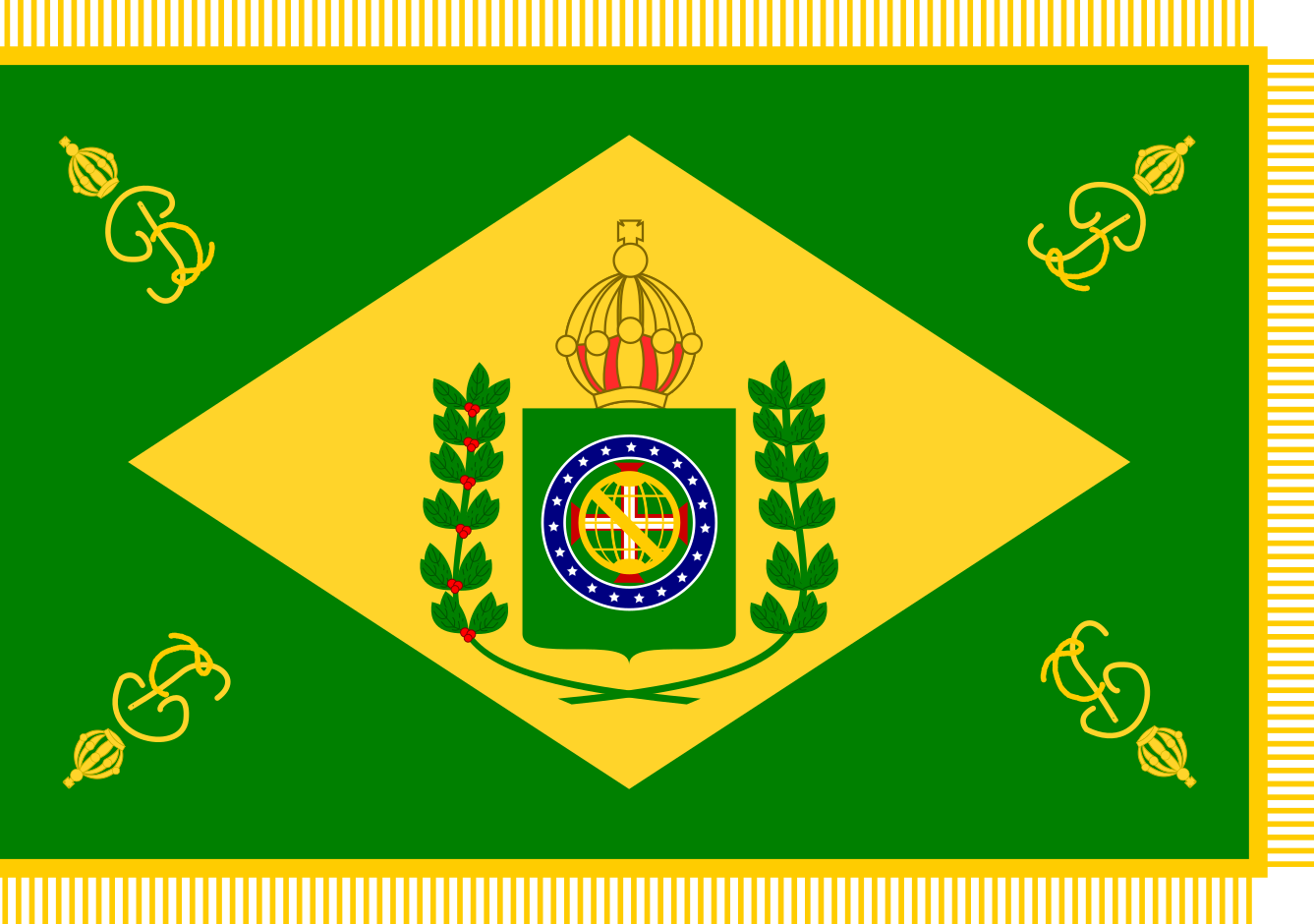
- Imperial Standard
- Founded: 7 September 1822; 203 years ago
- Disbanded: 15 November 1889; 136 years ago
- Service branches: Exército; Guarda Nacional; Fatherland Volunteers
- Headquarters: Acclamation Camp

Leadership
- Emperor: Pedro I (first; 1822–1831); Pedro II (last; 1831–1889)
- Ministry of War: Luís de Sousa Coutinho (first; 1822); Cândido Maria de Oliveira (last; 1889)

Personnel
- Active personnel: 14,300 (1889)

Related articles
- History: Military history of Brazil
- Ranks: Military ranks of the Empire of Brazil

The Imperial Brazilian Army (Portuguese: Exército Imperial Brasileiro) was the name given to the land force of the Empire of Brazil. The Brazilian Army was formed after the independence of the country from Portugal in 1822 and reformed in 1889, after the republican coup d'état that created the First Brazilian Republic, a dictatorship headed by the army.

== Formation ==
During the Independence process, the Imperial Brazilian Army was initially composed of Brazilians, Portuguese, and foreign mercenaries. Trained in guerrilla warfare, most of its commanders were mercenaries and Portuguese officers loyal to Pedro I. In 1822 and 1823, the Imperial Army was able to defeat the Portuguese resistance, especially in the north of the country and in Cisplatina, also preventing the fragmentation of the newly proclaimed Brazilian Empire after its independence war.

After the Independence War the Army, supported by the National Guard, destroyed separatist movements in the early years after independence, enforcing the central authority of the empire during the regency period. It repressed a host of popular movements for political autonomy or against slavery and the large landowners' power across Brazil.

During the 1850s and early 1860s, the Army, along with the Navy, entered in action against Argentine and Uruguayan forces, which were opposed to the Brazilian empire's interests. The Brazilian success with such "Gun Diplomacy" eventually led to a shock of interests with another country with similar aspirations, Paraguay, in December 1864.

In November 1889, after a long attrition with the monarchical regime deepened by the abolition of slavery, the army led a coup d'état that resulted in the end of the empire and the founding of a republic. The implementation of the first Brazilian military dictatorship (that ended in 1894), was followed by a severe economic crisis that deepened into an institutional one with Congress and the Navy, which degenerated into a civil war in the southern region.

== Command ==
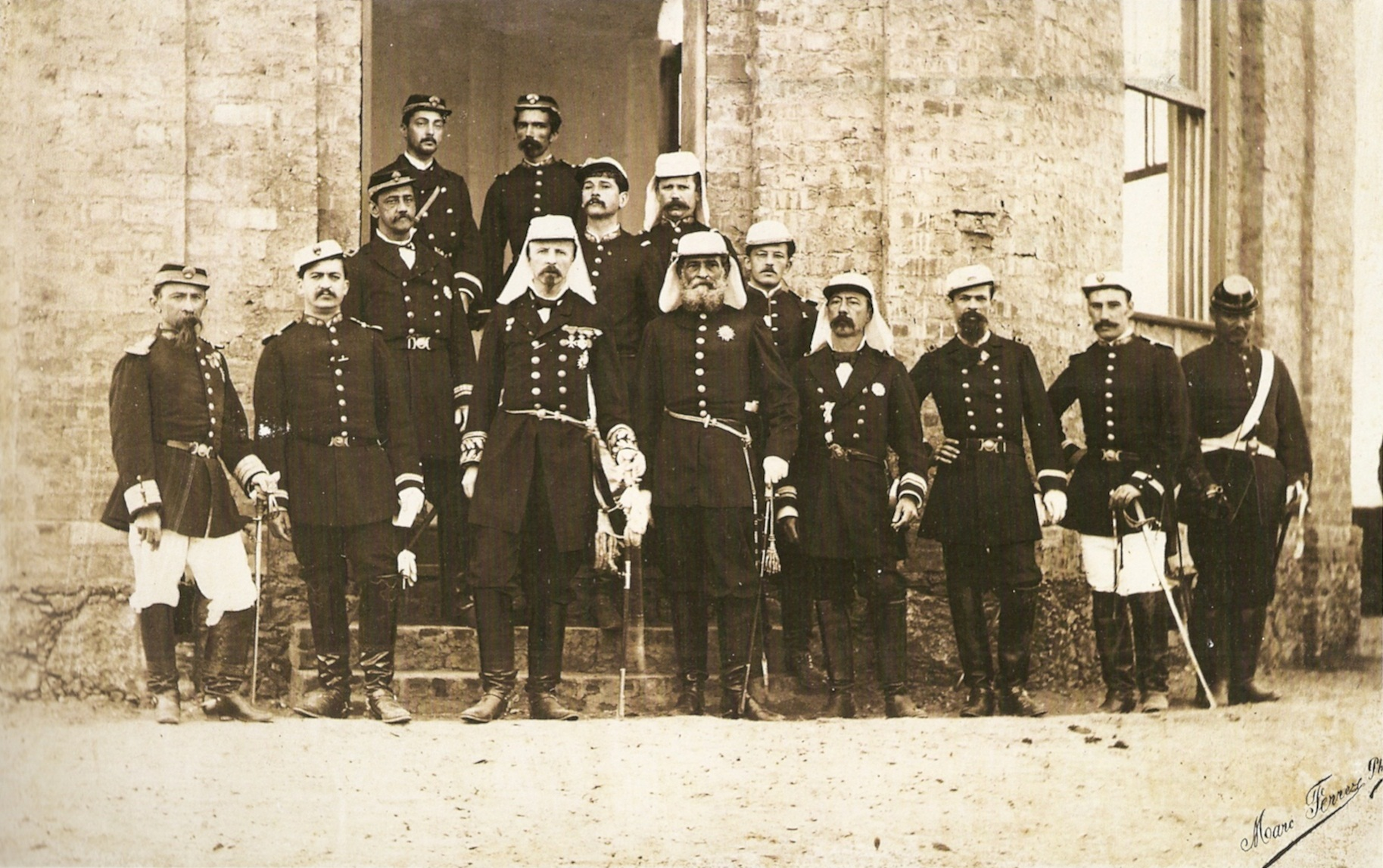
High command of the Imperial Army in 1885, including Prince Gaston, Count of Eu and Deodoro da Fonseca, 1st President of Brazil.

Under Articles 102 and 148 of the Constitution, the Brazilian Armed Forces were subordinate to the monarch as commander-in-chief. The commander-in-chief was aided by the Ministry of War. During the 67 years of the monarchy's existence there were 76 ministers of war—who were, with few exceptions, civilians. The prime minister exercised ultimate oversight in practice.

The model chosen was the British parliamentary or Anglo-American system, in which "the country's Armed Forces observed unrestricted obedience to the civilian government while maintaining distance from political decisions and decisions referring to borders' security".

== Structure ==
The National Army, or Imperial Army during the monarchy, was divided into two branches: the 1st Line, which was the Army itself; and the 2nd Line, which was formed by the Militias and Orderlies inherited from the colonial times. The military was organized along similar lines to the British and American armed forces of the time, in which a small standing army could quickly augment its strength during emergencies from a reserve militia force (in Brazil, the National Guard). By 1824 the Army of the 1st Line included 24,000 men, who were disciplined, trained and equipped just as well as European equivalents. At the end of the war of Independence, the Brazilian Armed Forces were already well organized and equipped. This occurred mainly because the Emperor heavily supported the Army.

=== Military education ===
Year	Army (1st Line)	Army (2nd Line)
1824	24,000	Unknown
1827	27,242	95,000
1832	6,000	Unknown
1838	18,000	Unknown
1851	37,000	Unknown
1864	18,000	440,000
1869	82,271	Unknown
1875	17,000	Unknown
1883	13,000	Unknown
1889	14,300	Unknown

Army officers' training was completed in the Imperial Military Academy, although it was not obligatory for personnel to study there to advance in the profession. Personnel from the infantry and cavalry branches only needed to study the disciplines of the 1st year (arithmetic, algebra, geometry, trigonometry and technical drawing) and 5th year (tactical, strategy, camping, fortification in campaign, terrain reconnaissance and chemistry). Engineers and artillerymen were obliged to study the complete course, which resulted in their branches being considered the most prestigious.

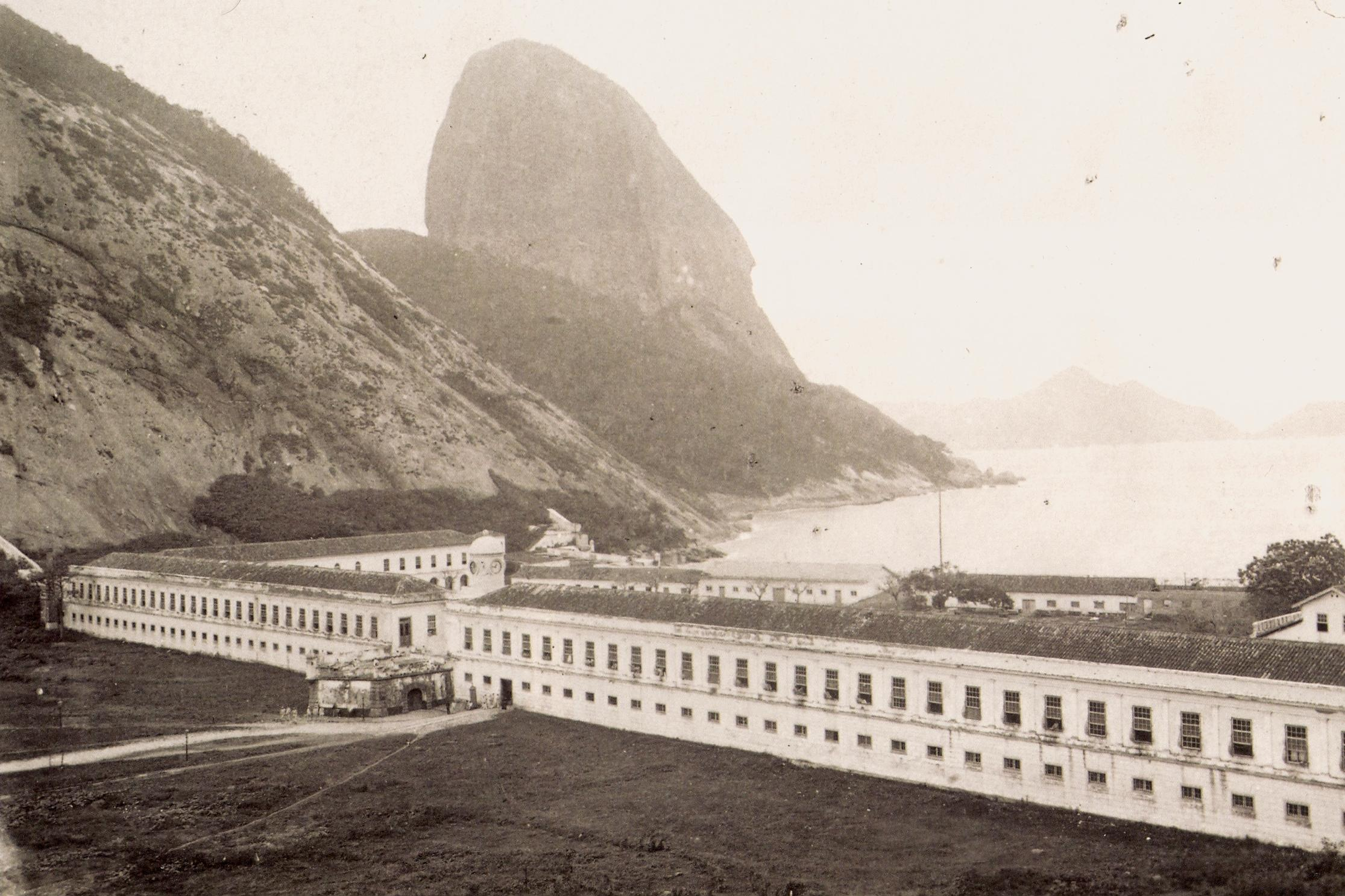
Military College (known before as Military Academy) in Rio de Janeiro, 1888.

However, if they preferred, infantrymen and cavalrymen were allowed to study the disciplines of the 2nd year (algebra, geometry, analytical geometry, differential and integral calculus, descriptive geometry and technical drawing); 3rd year (mechanics, ballistics and technical drawing); 4th year (spherical trigonometry, physics, astronomy, geodesy, geography and technical drawing); 6th year (regular and irregular fortification, attacking and defending strongholds, civil architecture, roads, ports, canals, mineralogy and technical drawing); and 7th year (artillery, mines and natural history). In 1845 the Military College (originally known as the Military Academy) was divided into two-halves: one half retained the name "Military College" and the other half became the Central College. A new reform (Decree nº 585) on 6 September 1850, considerably improved the quality of the officers of the Imperial Army. From then on, progression in a soldier's military career would occur through antiquity, merit and academic resume, beyond a clear preference for the personnel who completed the Military College over the ones who did not. On 20 September 1851, the conservative cabinet created a branch of the Military College in Porto Alegre. The Porto Alegre college location provided courses in infantry and cavalry, including disciplines taken from the 1st and 5th years of study. The National Guard was reorganized in the same month and became subordinate directly to the Minister of Justice, instead of to the locally elected Judges of Peace.

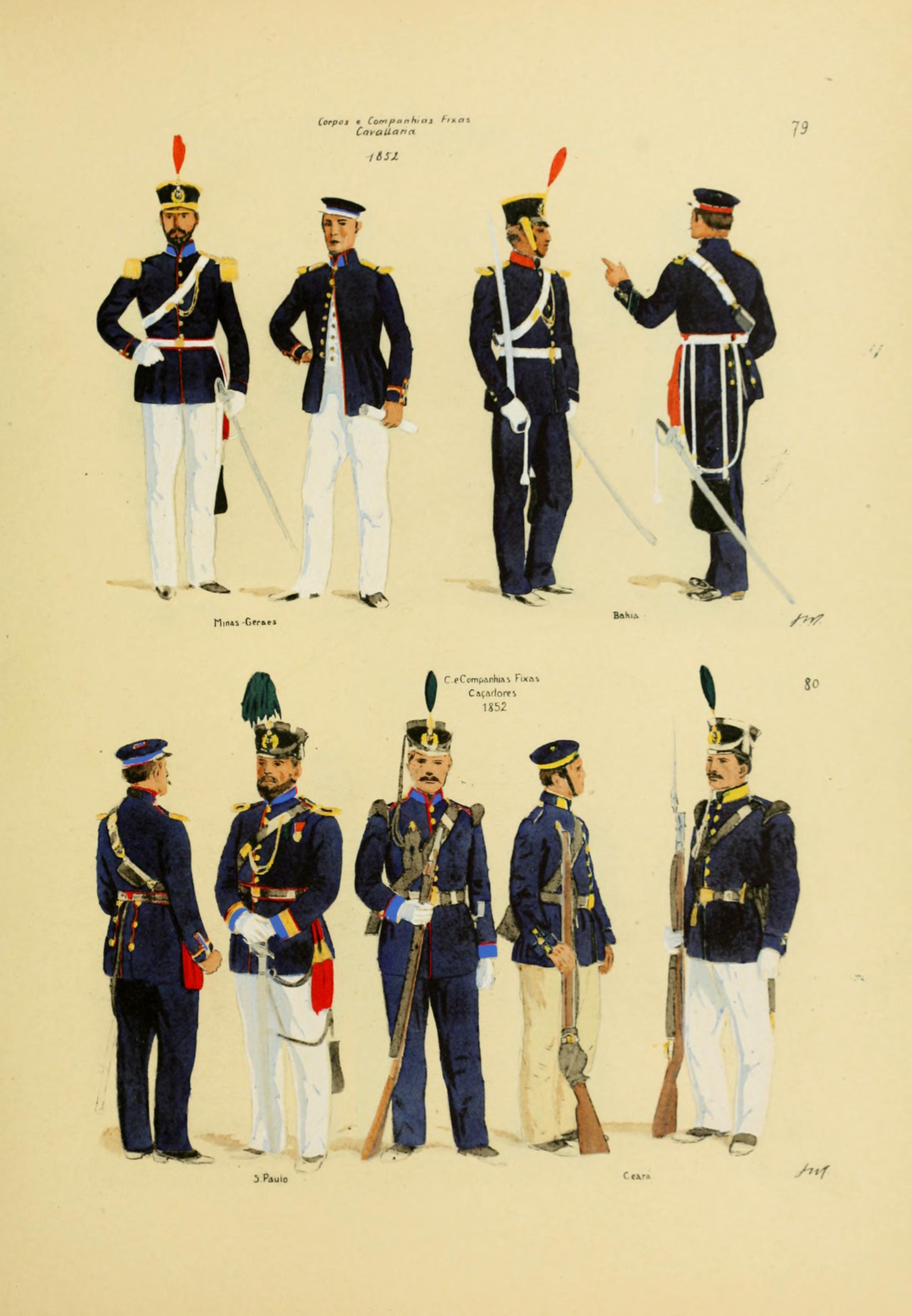
Imperial army uniform in various provinces

In 1874 the Polytechnical College of Rio de Janeiro was created from the Military School. The new college focused on the provision of civil engineering courses. For the 1873–74 fiscal year, the Government allocated about 27 percent of the budget for the Army and the Navy.

== Reserve system ==
There was continuity in the recruitment of soldiers between the beginning of the Republic, the Empire of Brazil, the colony and Portugal, although the Portuguese model in the 17th and 18th centuries, typical of the European Old Regime, found different conditions in Portuguese America. The distinction between regular or first-line troops and the milícias and ordenanças was also a Portuguese heritage. These were replaced in the Empire of Brazil by the National Guard, whose recruitment (called "enlistment") was complementary and antagonistic, absorbing personnel of a higher social level. National guardsmen were exempt from recruitment into the Army and Navy, and the institution was therefore one of the forms of evasion. National guardsmen were considered citizens and qualified, and their service a duty to the country, very different from first-line troops.

Soldiers in 19th century Brazil were recruited voluntarily or by force. Recruitment focused on "vagrants, ex-slaves, orphans, criminals, migrants, unskilled workers and the unemployed". Military service was considered degrading by the free poor population. Recruitment, called "blood tax" at the time, was violent and followed by a life of punishment and low pay. It managed to attract few recruits, as it was carried out by a weak state (police, civil service and civil registry) in a resistant population. The Paraguayan War strained the system and was time-consuming in part due to inefficient mobilization. In Europe, a reference for the Brazilian elite, the period after the Franco-Prussian War (1870–1871) was marked by industrialization, states with greater control over their populations and conscript armies, which, after 1–3 years of service, followed into a growing reserve. Brazil was very far from this model.

== Wars and rebellions ==
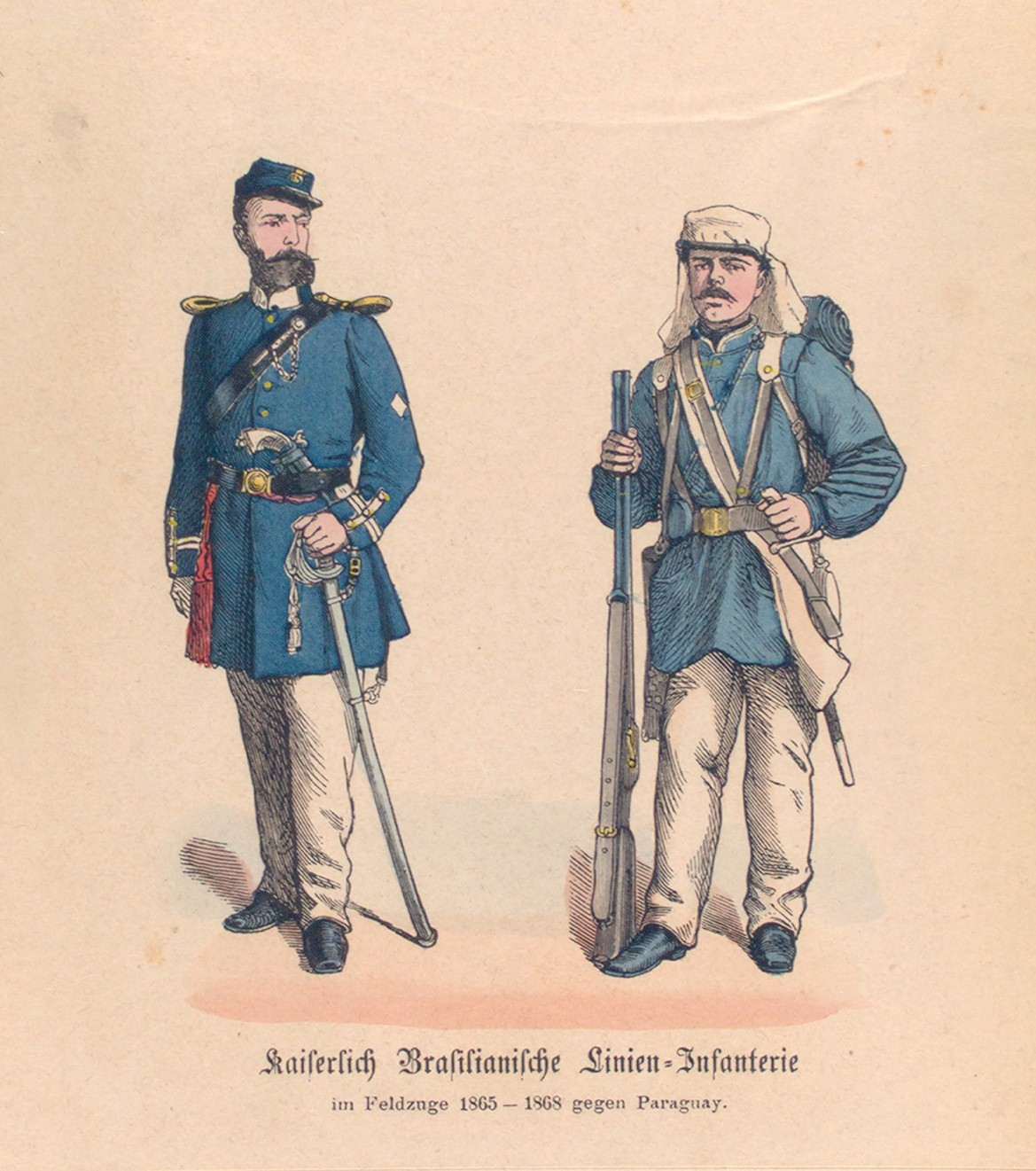
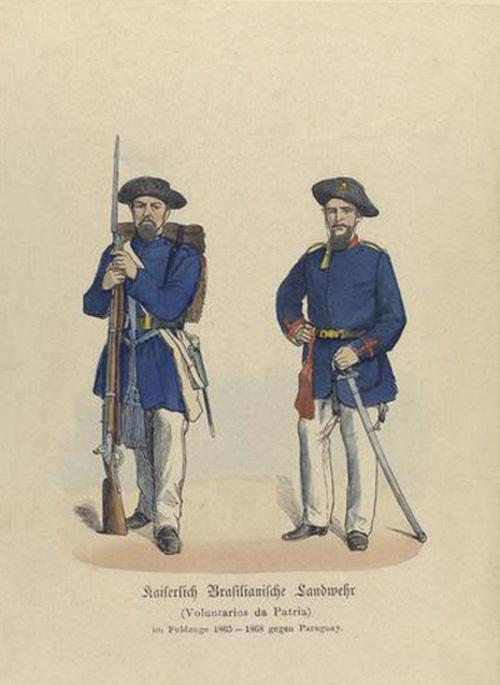
Uniforms of the Brazilian Imperial Army during the Paraguayan War, 1866.

=== Cisplatine War ===
The Empire declared war against the United Provinces of the Río de la Plata (present-day Argentina) in 1825 because that nation was aiding the secessionist revolt of the Brazilian Cisplatina province. The Argentines and the Cisplatine secessionist troops made use of guerrilla tactics that prevented the much larger Brazilian Army (1st Line with 27,242 men and 2nd Line with 95,000) from delivering an overwhelming blow against its enemies. By the end of the conflict more than 8,000 Brazilians had died and the esteem associated with a career in the military declined. The resulting withdraw led to the independence of Cisplatina, which became Uruguay, and was the only war not won by Brazil in its independent history. In the aftermath, the military blamed the Emperor for not being able to convince the Parliament to allow more financial aid to purchase equipment, munitions and provisions, while the liberals, on the other hand, considered the monarch responsible for the high costs of the conflict.

=== Regency period ===
Pedro I's abdication resulted in the reduction of the size of the Army contingent. The liberals were against the Army for ideological and economic reasons. Their objective was to prevent any possibility of return to Brazil by Pedro I, so they weakened one of the institutions most connected to the former Emperor. Some battalions were dissolved while others were transferred to distant provinces. Most of the soldiers were discharged; enlistment was suspended and the promotion of any officer was forbidden.

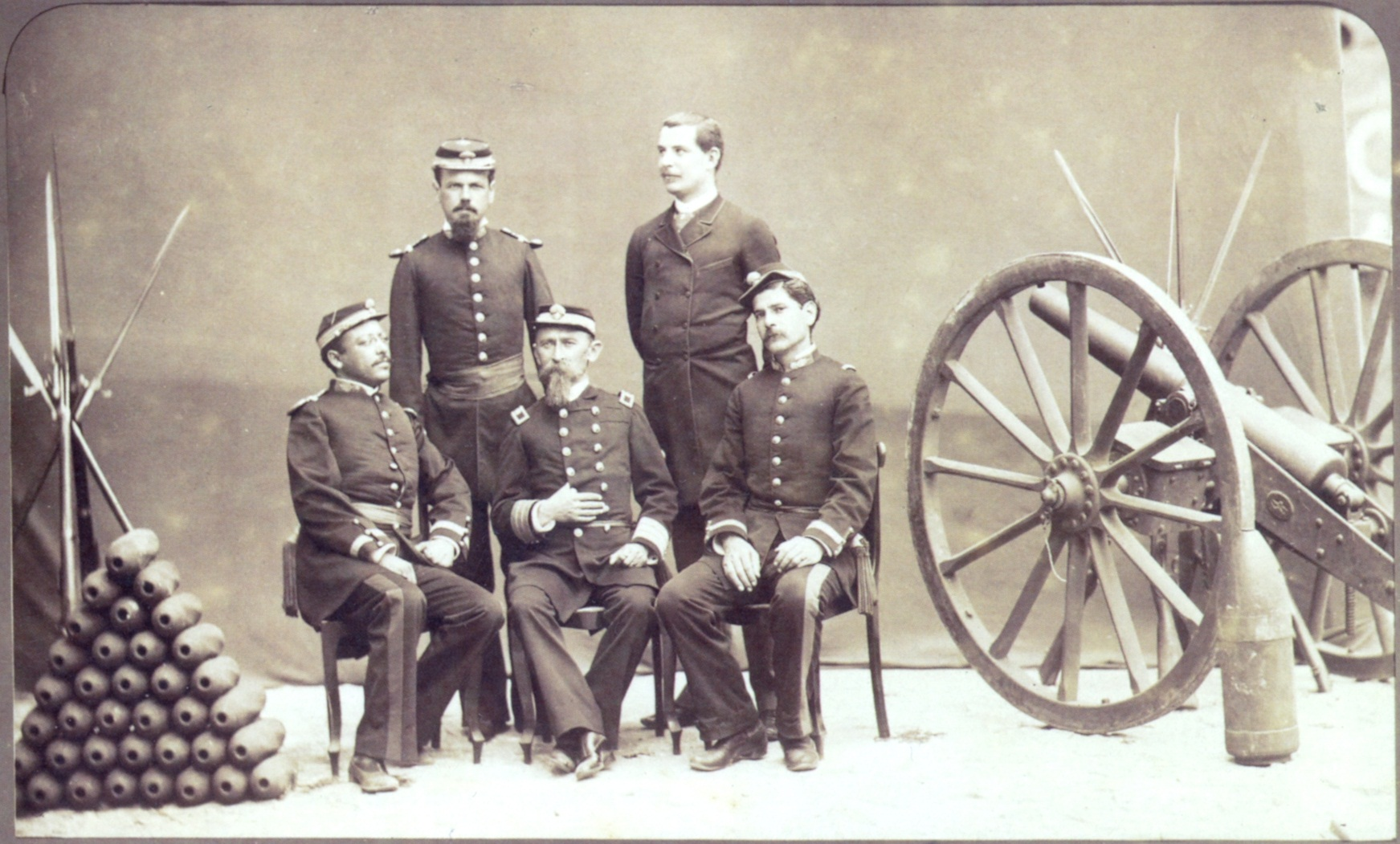
Officers of the Imperial Army next to a cannon, 1886.

On 30 August 1831, the liberal regency reduced the Army to fewer than 10,000 men. Later reductions left only 6,000 soldiers. The battalions formed by mercenaries were also disbanded.

With the intention of assisting the smaller Army, the Government created the National Guard on 18 August 1831. The new institution would substitute for the old Militias and Orderlies that were extinguished at the same time. The Guard did not have permanent troops nor barracks for lodging troops. In war times the National Guard was incorporated into the Army of 1st Line and it was, for all effects, a reserve force of the Imperial Army.

The results of the Liberal's policy towards the Army were soon felt. The Government was incapable of fighting the rebellions that occurred in the country during the second half of the 1830s. The election of the conservative Pedro de Araújo Lima for the office of regent in 1837 completely changed the situation. The Conservative Party restored the Army, reorganized and reequipped its ranks, and increased its size to 18,000 men. The Imperial Army achieved several victories over the provincial revolts, including: Cabanagem, Sabinada, Ragamuffin War, among others. At the beginning of the 1840s a new reorganization of the Army gave it more cohesion and made it more capable.

=== Platine Wars ===
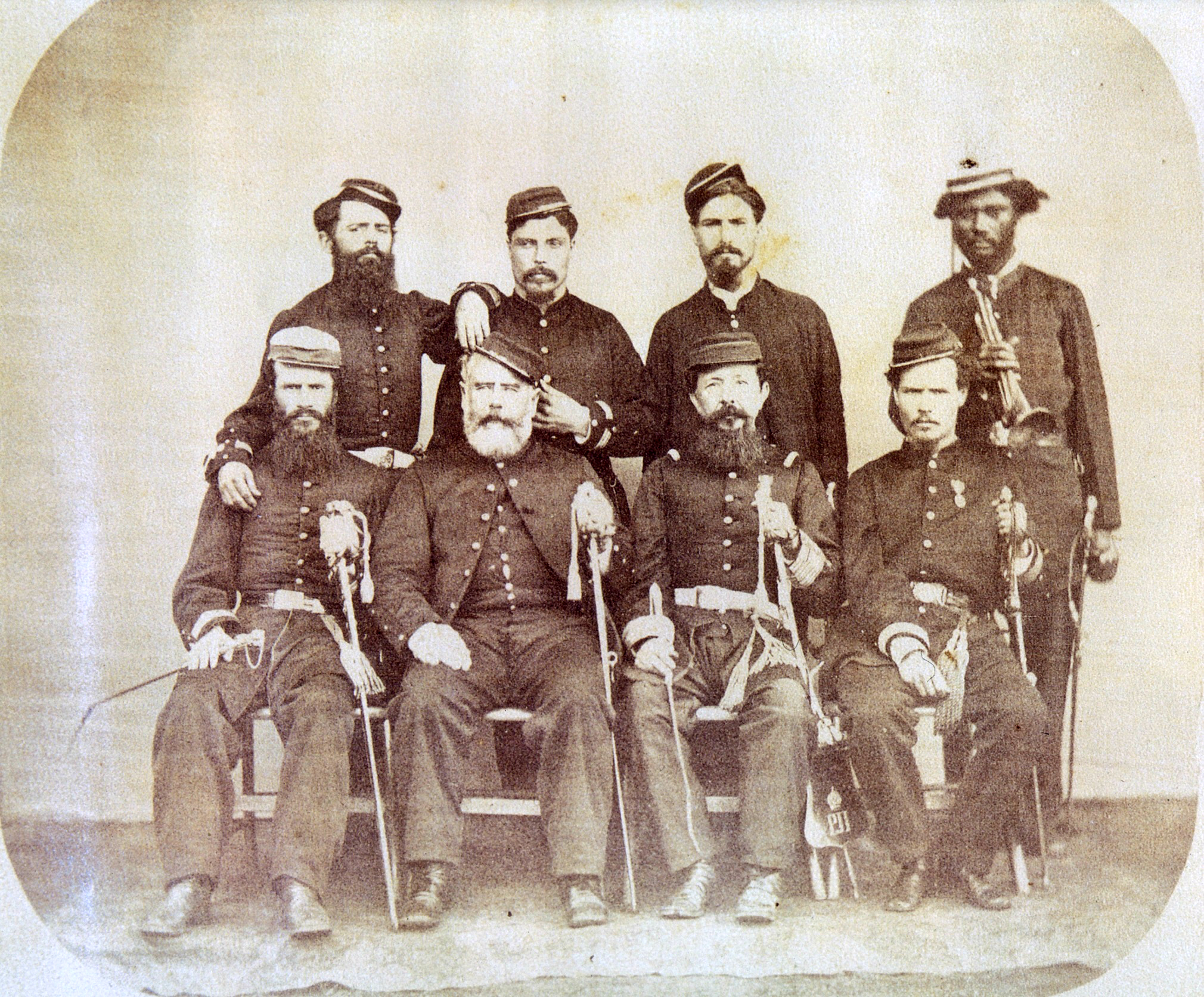
Colonel Joca Tavares (third sitting, from left to right) and his immediate assistants, including José Francisco Lacerda, better known as "Chico Diabo" (third standing, from left to right), responsible for killing Francisco Solano López in the Paraguayan War.

In 1851 the Imperial Army was composed of more than 37,000 men which 20,000 participated in the Platine War against the Argentine Confederation which opposed to Brazilian Empire's interests. The war ended in 1852 with the Brazilian victory at the Battle of Caseros, for some time establishing Brazilian hegemony over South America. The war ushered a period of economic and political stability in the Empire.

The Uruguayan War (which was followed by the Paraguayan War) revealed the complete neglect subjected on the Imperial Army after 1852. The Army did not have enough equipment, ammunition, uniforms or transportation. With only 18,000 men in 1864 it was necessary to search for reserve forces to collaborate with the war effort. In 1864 the National Guard enrollment was 440,000 men. In spite of the impressive numbers, the Guard's military potential was considerably reduced by their lack of training and equipment and the resistance by most Guard members to deployment to the theater of operations. From then on the National Guard would be gradually put aside in favor of the Army. The Fatherland Volunteers Corps was created on 7 January 1865. The Corps received volunteer and conscripted Brazilians. The nomination of the Marquis of Caxias as the commander of the Imperial Army in the middle of 1866 put an end to the anarchy. In 1865 18,000 men were deployed in enemy territory. This number grew to 67,365 in 1866; 71,039 in 1867; and finally 82,271 in 1869.

The Marquis of Caxias reorganized the troops who received uniforms, equipment and weapons equal in quality to those of the Prussian Army. The health service of the Armed Forces was inferior to American Civil War health care, but was superior to Crimean War health programs. The armed conflict lasted for more than five years and cost the lives of 50,000 Brazilians. However, the Empire attained victory and maintained its supremacy over the rest of South America. The Imperial Army mobilized 154,996 men for the war, divided into the following categories: 10,025 Army personnel who were in Uruguay in 1864; 2,047 in the province of Mato Grosso; 55,985 Fatherland Volunteers; 60,009 National Guardsmen; 8,570 ex-slaves; and an additional 18,000 National Guardsmen who remained in Brazil to defend their homeland.

== Industrial base ==
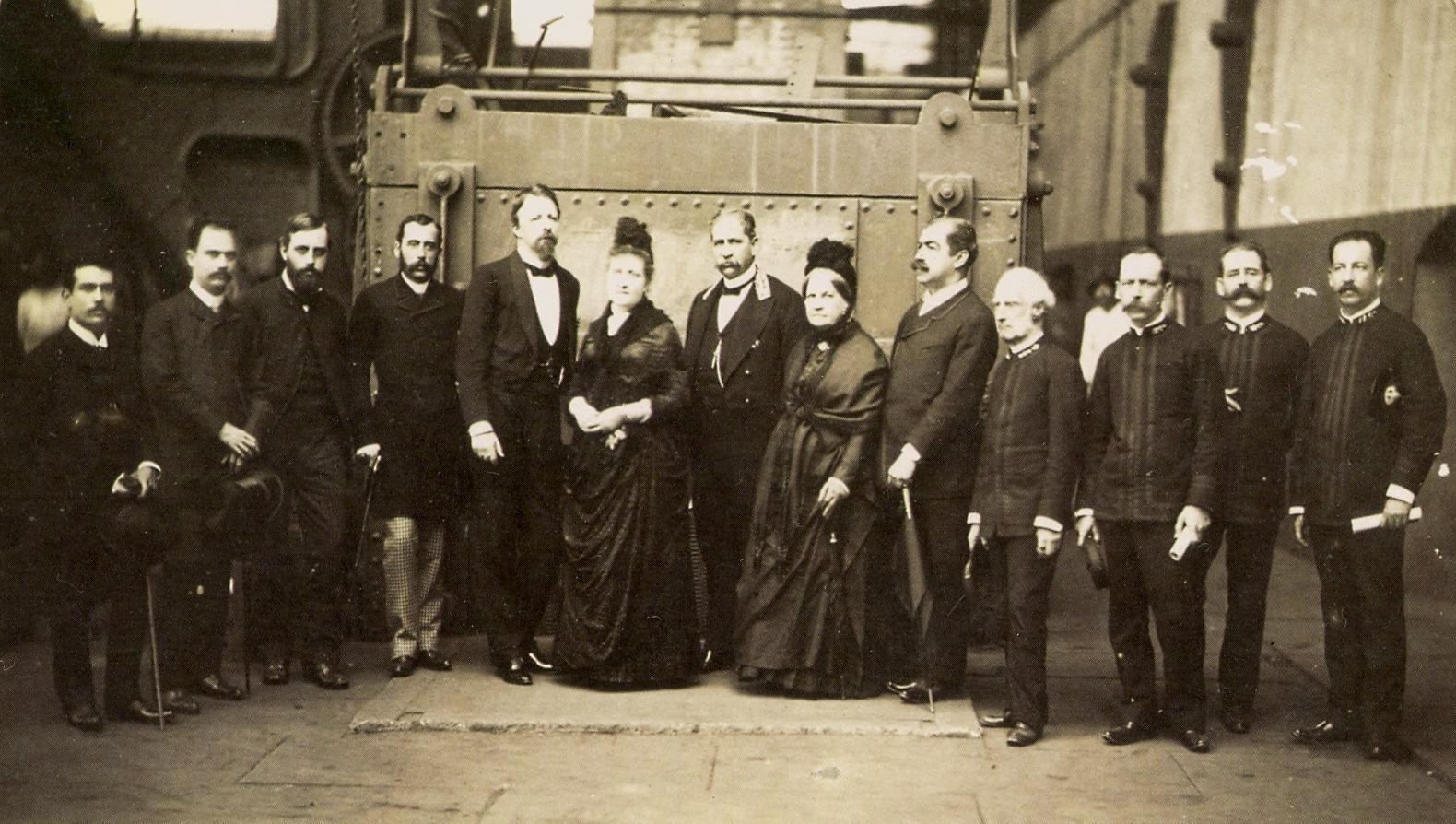
Prince Gaston, Count of Eu and Isabel, Princess Imperial along with officials visiting the plant dedicated to the manufacture of military weapons, 1886

Brazil had the largest industrial base in the whole Latin America and the second largest in the Americas after the United States. The army, unlike the Imperial Navy, suffered with much less investment, especially during the regency, rendering it inadequate, ill-trained, and ill-armed. From the 1850s began a slow modernization of the army, led by the Marquis of Caxias, beginning with doctrine and the acquisition of new armaments, including machine guns and new and modern artillery guns. During the Paraguayan War even an observation balloon previously used in the American Civil War was acquired by the Imperial Army. The Brazilian military industry emerged from the iron industry started by Viscount of Maua and was developing slowly.

== Republican Coup d'État ==
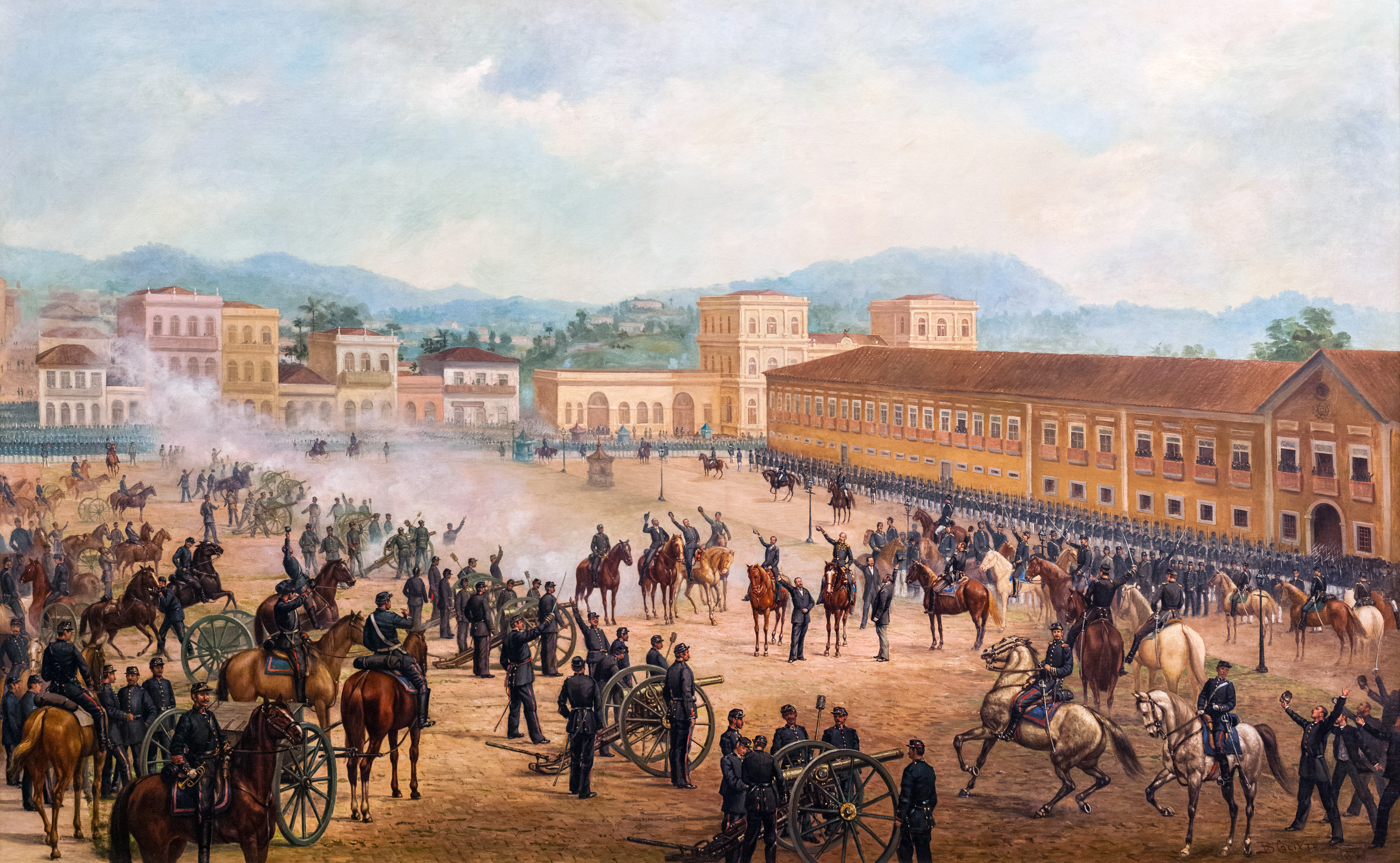
The Proclamation of the Republic led by the Army, 15 November 1889.

A new generation of turbulent and undisciplined military personnel began to appear at the beginning of the 1880s, because the old monarchist officers, such as Duke of Caxias, Polidoro da Fonseca Quintanilha Jordão (Viscount of Santa Teresa), Antonio de Sampaio, Manuel Marques de Sousa, Count of Porto Alegre and Manuel Luís Osório, Marquis of Erval were dead. In an Army with only 13,000 men, 7,526 were sent to jail in 1884 for bad behavior. The cadets in the Military College learned about Positivism and discussed politics while completely ignoring military matters. These men advocated the establishment of a military dictatorship. In 1882, Army military officers murdered a journalist in broad day light when he criticized the behavior of the Army. The murder went unpunished. The republicans stimulated the undisciplined behavior of these personnel during 1887 and 1888 by alleging a lack of attention and consideration on the part of the Government towards the Army.

On 15 November 1889, the monarchy was overthrown by Army troops led by Field Marshal Deodoro da Fonseca who became the leader of the First Brazilian Republic, known as Sword Dictatorship. Marshal Câmara (Viscount of Pelotas), affirmed that about 20 percent of the Imperial Army supported the coup. In the following days several battalions of the Army, which were spread across the country, fought against republican forces with the intention of stopping the coup. In Desterro, the 25th Infantry Battalion attacked the Republican Club on 17 November 1889. A month later on 18 December, in Rio de Janeiro, the 2nd Artillery Regiment tried to restore the monarchy. In 1893, Monarchist soldiers participated in the Federalist Revolution with the intention of restoring the Empire. The Monarchists who did not die in battle were imprisoned, deported or murdered.

== See also ==
- Armed Forces of the Empire of Brazil
- Brazilian Army in the First Republic
- Military history of Brazil
