= Military of the Empire of Brazil =

Military forces of the erstwhile Empire of Brazil (1822–1889)

- Forças armadas do Império do Brasil
- Estandarte Imperial

- Flag of the Empire of Brazil
- Founded: 1822
- Current form: Brazilian Armed Forces
- Disbanded: 1889
- Service branches: Imperial Army; Imperial Navy

Leadership
- Commander-in-Chief: Pedro I (1822–31); Pedro II (1831–89)
- Minister of War: See list
- Minister of Navy: See list

Expenditure
- Budget: $625 million USD (total; 1888) ($1.9 billion USD in 2022)

Related articles
- History: Military history of Brazil; Brazilian War of Independence; Cisplatine War; Platine War; Uruguayan War; Paraguayan War
- Ranks: Military ranks of the Empire of Brazil

The military of the Empire of Brazil was first formed by Emperor Dom Pedro I to defend the new nation against the Portuguese in the Brazilian War of Independence. The Army and Armada (as the Navy was called) were commissioned in 1822 with the objective of defeating and expelling the Portuguese troops from Brazilian soil.

From the time of its inception, the military played a decisive role in the history of the Empire of Brazil. A sense of national unity and identity was forged out of the victorious Paraguayan War. The Emperor was commander-in-chief of the military, with the Ministries of War and Navy as the main organs by which military policy was carried out.

== Organization ==
The imperial armed forces were subordinated to the emperor, its commander-in-chief. He was aided by the ministers of War and Navy in regard to matters concerning the Army and the Armada (Navy), respectively. Traditionally, the ministers of War and Navy were civilians but there were some exceptions. The model chosen was the British parliamentary or Anglo-American system, in which "the country's Armed Forces observed unrestricted obedience to the civilian government while maintaining distance from political decisions and decisions referring to borders' security".

== Recruitment ==
The recruitment for the armed forces of the Empire of Brazil, generally considered the imposition of a strong state on a recalcitrant society, was shaped by a complex network of patron-client relationships between the State, the members of the plantation class, and the free poor. These well-established (and in general legitime) relationships survived the challenges of recruitment in times of war and prevented reformers from establishing a system of conscription that was regular and fair.

== Armada ==
=== Early years, 1822–31 ===
The National Armada (later known as the Brazilian Navy), informally known as Imperial Armada, appeared with the independence of the country. The Armada was formed almost entirely by ships, staff, organizations and doctrines proceeding from the transference of the Portuguese Royal Family in 1808. Some of its members were native-born Brazilians, who under Portugal had been forbidden to serve. Other members were Portuguese who adhered to the cause of separation and foreign mercenaries. Some establishments created by King João VI of Portugal were used and incorporated such as the Department of Navy, Headquarters of the Navy, the Intendancy and Accounting Department, the Arsenal (Shipyard) of the Navy, the Academy of Navy Guards, the Naval Hospital, the Auditorship, the Supreme Military Council, the powder plant, and others. The Brazilian-born Captain Luís da Cunha Moreira was chosen as the first minister of the Navy on 28 October 1822.

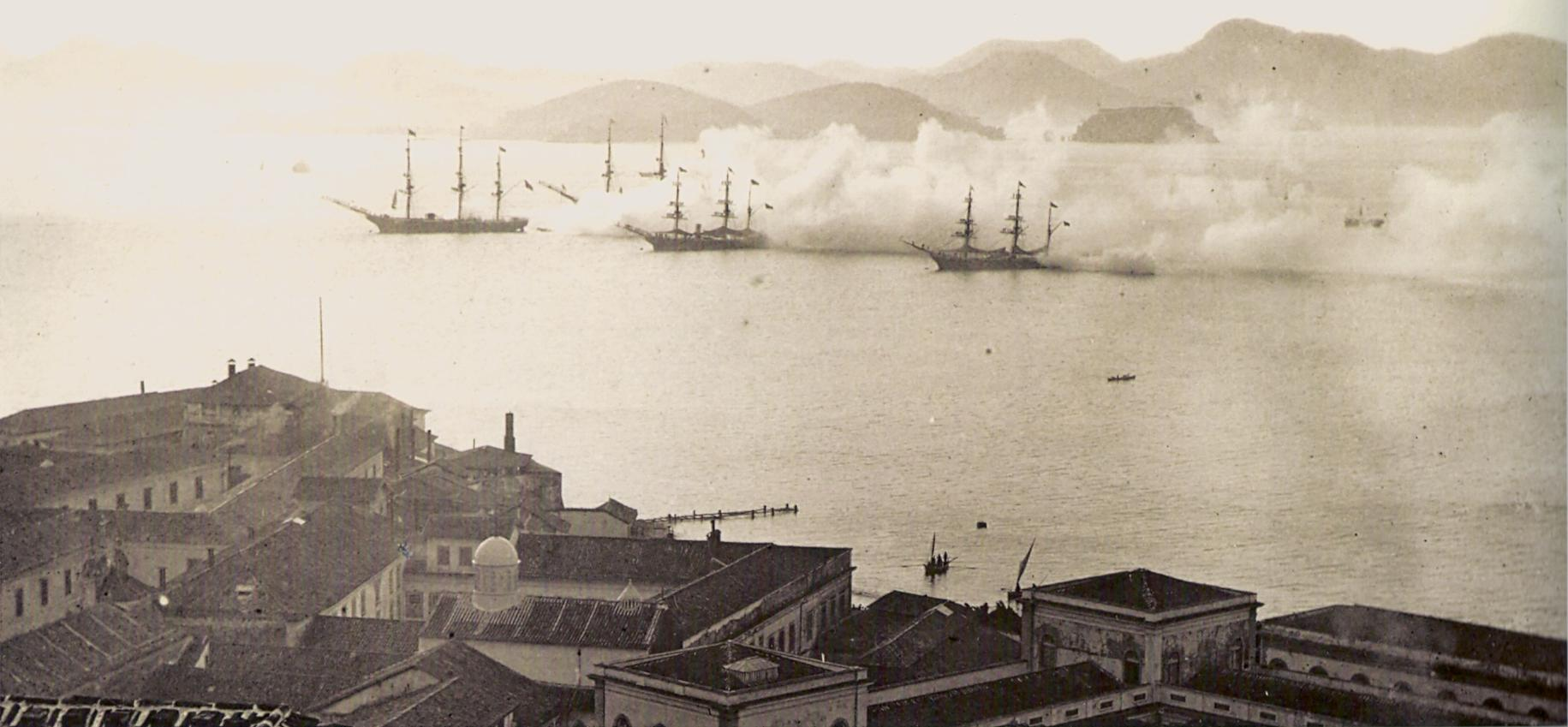
Training of the Armada during the 1870s.

Britisher Lord Thomas Alexander Cochrane was nominated the commander of the Brazilian Armada and received the rank of "First Admiral". At that time, the fleet was composed of one ship of the line, four frigates, and smaller ships for a total of 38 warships. The Secretary of Treasury Martim Francisco Ribeiro de Andrada created a national subscription to generate capital in order to increase the size of the fleet. Contributions were sent from all over Brazil. Even the Emperor Dom Pedro I acquired a merchant brig at his own expense (that was renamed "Caboclo") and donated it to the State. The navy fought in the north and also south of Brazil where it had a decisive role in the independence of the country.

After the suppression of the revolt in Pernambuco in 1824 and prior to the Cisplatine War, the navy increased significantly in size and strength. Starting with 38 ships in 1822, eventually the navy had 96 modern warships of various types with over 690 cannons. The Armada blocked the estuary of the Rio de la Plata hindering the contact of the United Provinces (as Argentina was then called) with the Cisplatine rebels and the outside world. Several battles had occurred between Brazilian and Argentine ships until the defeat of an Argentine flotilla composed of two corvettes, five brigs and one barquentine near the Island of Santiago in 1827. When Pedro I abdicated in 1831, he left a powerful navy made up of two ships of the line and ten frigates in addition to corvettes, steamships, and other ships for a total of at least 80 warships in peacetime.

=== Quelling rebellions, 1831–49 ===
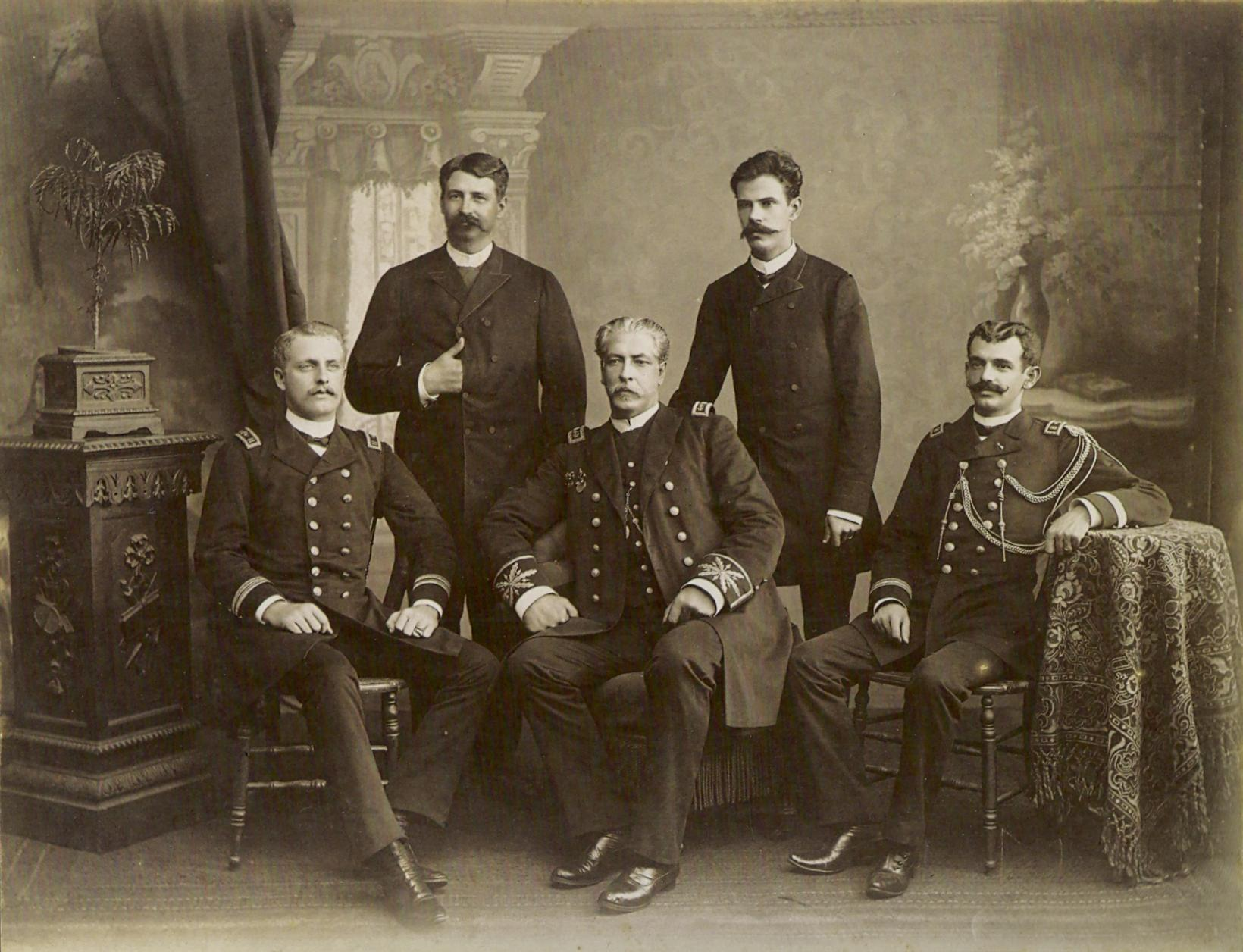
Officers of the Armada. Seated, prince August (left) and Admiral Eduardo Wandenkolk (center), 1889.

During the 58-year reign of Dom Pedro II the Brazilian Navy achieved its greatest strength in relation to navies around the world. The Arsenal, Navy department, and the Naval Jail were improved and the Imperial Mariner Corps (formed then by volunteers) was created. Steam navigation was definitively adopted. Brazil quickly modernized the fleet acquiring ships from foreign sources while also constructing others locally. Brazil's Navy substituted the old smoothbore cannons for new ones with rifled barrels, which were more accurate and had longer ranges. Improvements were also made in the Arsenals (shipyards) and naval bases, which were equipped with new workshops. Ships were constructed in the Arsenal of the Navy in Rio de Janeiro, Salvador, Recife, Santos, Niterói and Pelotas. The Armada also successfully fought against all revolts that occurred during the Regency (where it made blockades and transported the Army troops) including: Cabanagem, Ragamuffin War, Sabinada, Balaiada, amongst others.

When Emperor Pedro II was declared of legal age and assumed his constitutional prerogatives in 1840, the Armada had over 90 warships: six frigates, seven corvettes, two barque-schooners, six brigs, eight brig-schooners, 16 gunboats, 12 schooners, seven armed brigantine-schooners, six steam barques, three transport ships, two armed luggers, two cutters and thirteen larger boats. The number of artillery pieces was approximately 236 simple cannons and mortars. These came to be used in the repression of rebellions in the North and Northeast of the Empire.

During the 1850s the State Secretary, the Accounting Department of the Navy, the Headquarters of the Navy and the Naval Academy were reorganized and improved. New ships were purchased and the ports administrations were better equipped. The Imperial Mariner Corps was definitively regularized and the Marine Corps was created, taking the place of the Naval Artillery. The Service of Assistance for Invalids was also established, along with several schools for sailors and craftsmen.

=== Platine Wars, 1849–70 ===
Year	Navy (number of ships)
1822	38
1825	96
1831	80
1840	90
1851	59
1864	40
1870	94
1889	60

The conflicts in the Platine region did not cease after the war of 1825. The anarchy caused by the despotic Rosas and his desire to subdue Bolívia, Uruguay and Paraguay forced Brazil to intercede. The Brazilian Government sent a naval force of 17 warships (a ship of the line, 10 corvettes and six steamships) commanded by the veteran John Pascoe Grenfell. The Brazilian fleet succeeded in passing through the Argentine line of defence in The Tonelero Pass under heavy attack and transported the troops to the theater of operations. The Brazilian Armada had a total of 59 vessels of various types in 1851: 36 armed sailing ships, 10 armed steamships, seven unarmed sailing ships and six sailing transports.

More than a decade later the Armada was once again modernized and its fleet of old sailing ships was converted to a fleet of 40 steamships armed with more than 250 cannons. In 1864 the navy fought in the Uruguayan War and immediately afterwards in the Paraguayan War where it annihilated the Paraguayan navy in the Battle of Riachuelo. The navy was further augmented with the acquisition of 20 ironclads and six fluvial monitors. At least 9,177 navy personnel fought in the five years' conflict. Brazilian naval constructors such as Napoleão Level, Trajano de Carvalho and João Cândido Brasil planned new concepts for warships that allowed the country's Arsenals to retain their competitiveness with other nations. All damage suffered by ships was repaired and various improvements were made to the ships. In 1870, Brazil had 94 modern warships and had the fifth most powerful navy in the world.

=== Final years, 1870–89 ===
During the 1870s, the Brazilian Government strengthened the navy as the possibility of a war against Argentina over Paraguay's future became quite real. Thus, it acquired a gunboat and a corvette in 1873; an ironclad and a monitor in 1874; and immediately afterwards two cruisers and another monitor. The improvement of the Armada continued during the 1880s. The Arsenals of the Navy in the provinces of Rio de Janeiro, Bahia, Pernambuco, Pará and Mato Grosso continued to build dozens of warships. Also, four torpedo boats were purchased.

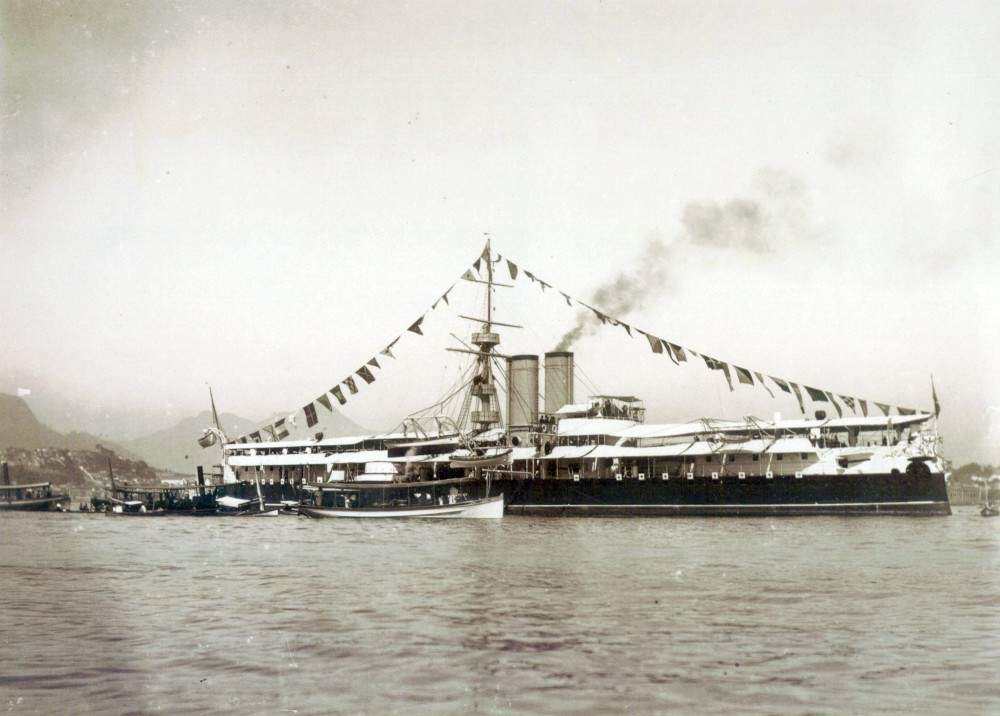
The ironclad Riachuelo, 1885.

On 30 November 1883, the Practical School of Torpedoes was created along with a workshop devoted to constructing and repairing torpedoes and electric devices in the Arsenal of Navy of Rio de Janeiro. This Arsenal constructed four steam gunboats and one schooner, all with iron and steel hulls (the first of these categories constructed in the country). The Imperial Armada reached its apex with the incorporation of the ironclad battleships Riachuelo and Aquidabã (both equipped with torpedo launchers) in 1884 and 1885, respectively. Both ships (considered state-of-the-art by experts from Europe) allowed the Brazilian Armada to retain its position as one of the most powerful naval forces. By 1889, the navy had 60 warships and was the fifth or sixth most powerful navy in the world.

In the last cabinet of the monarchic regime, the Minister of the Navy, Admiral José da Costa Azevedo (the Baron of Ladário), left the reorganization and modernization of the navy unfinished. The coup that ended the monarchy in Brazil in 1889 was not well accepted by the personnel of the Armada. Imperial Mariners were attacked when they tried to support the imprisoned Emperor in the City Palace. The Marquis of Tamandaré begged Pedro II to allow him to fight back the coup; however, the Emperor refused to allow any bloodshed. Tamandaré would later be imprisoned by order of the dictator Floriano Peixoto under the accusation of financing the monarchist military in the Federalist Revolution.

The Baron of Ladário remained in contact with the exiled Imperial Family, hoping to restore the monarchy, but ended up ostracized by the republican government. Admiral Saldanha da Gama led the Revolt of the Armada with the objective of restoring the Empire and allied himself with other monarchists who were fighting in the Federalist Revolution. However, all the attempts at restoration were violently crushed. High ranking Monarchist officers were imprisoned, banished or executed by firing squad without due process of law and their subordinates also suffered harsh punishments.

=== Gallery ===
Example of vessels commissioned during this period:

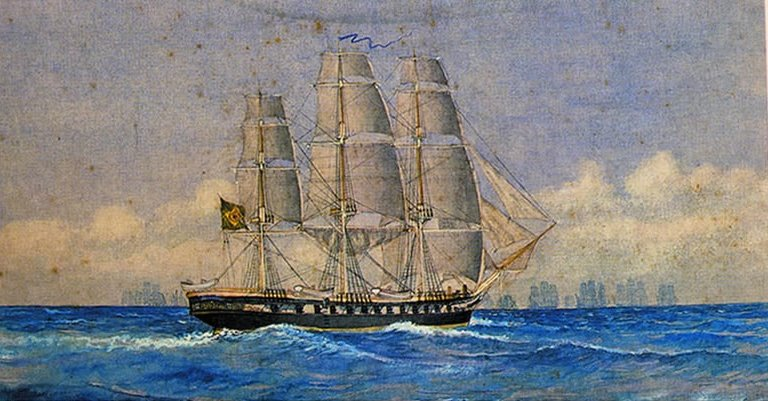
Frigate Nichteroy, 1823

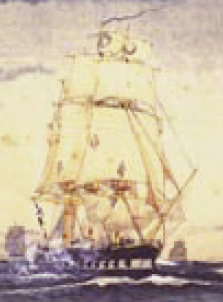
Escuna Bertioga, 1825

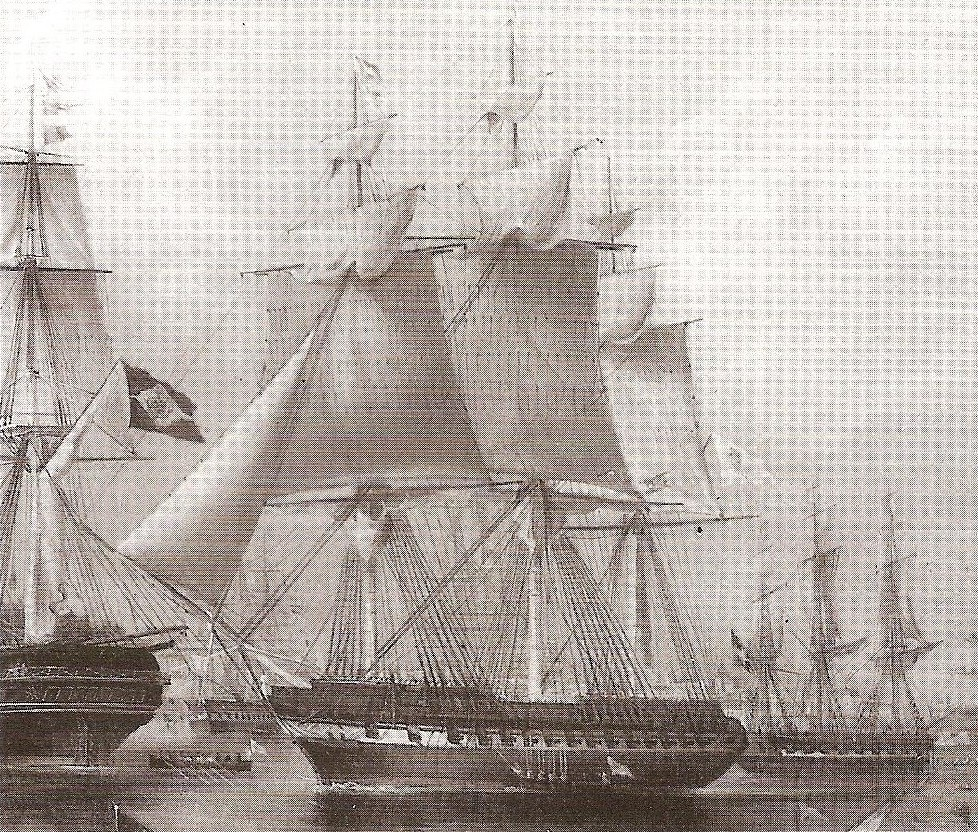
Frigate Amalia, 1843

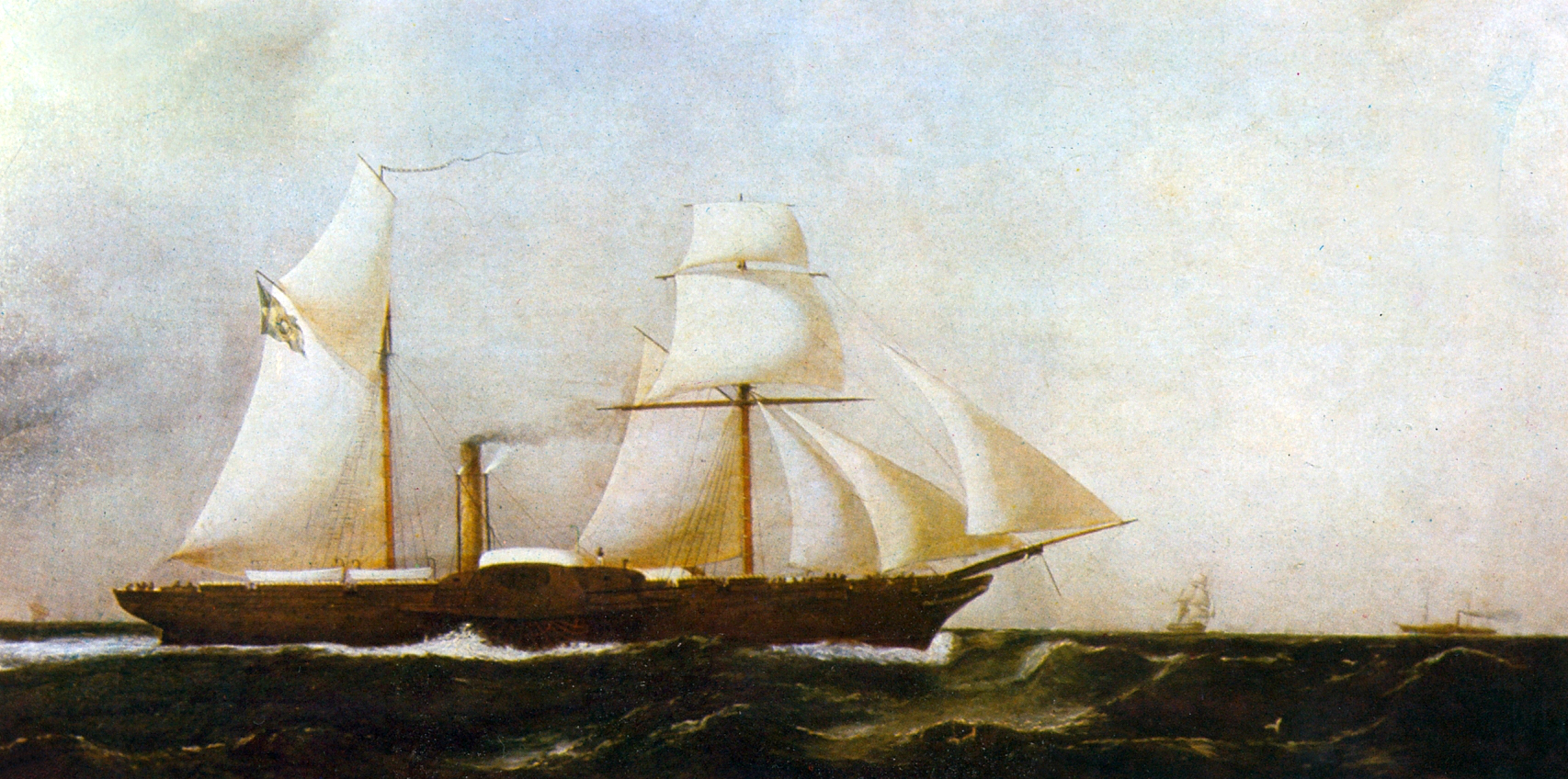
Steam corvette Dom Afonso, 1850

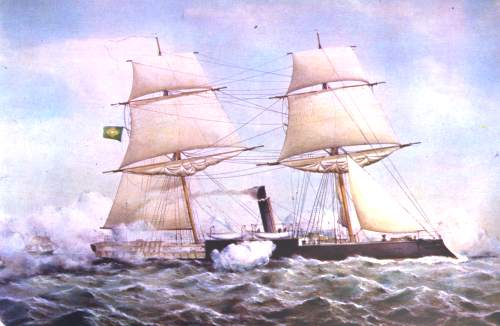
The Brazilian Ironclad Herval, built by Rennie in 1866.

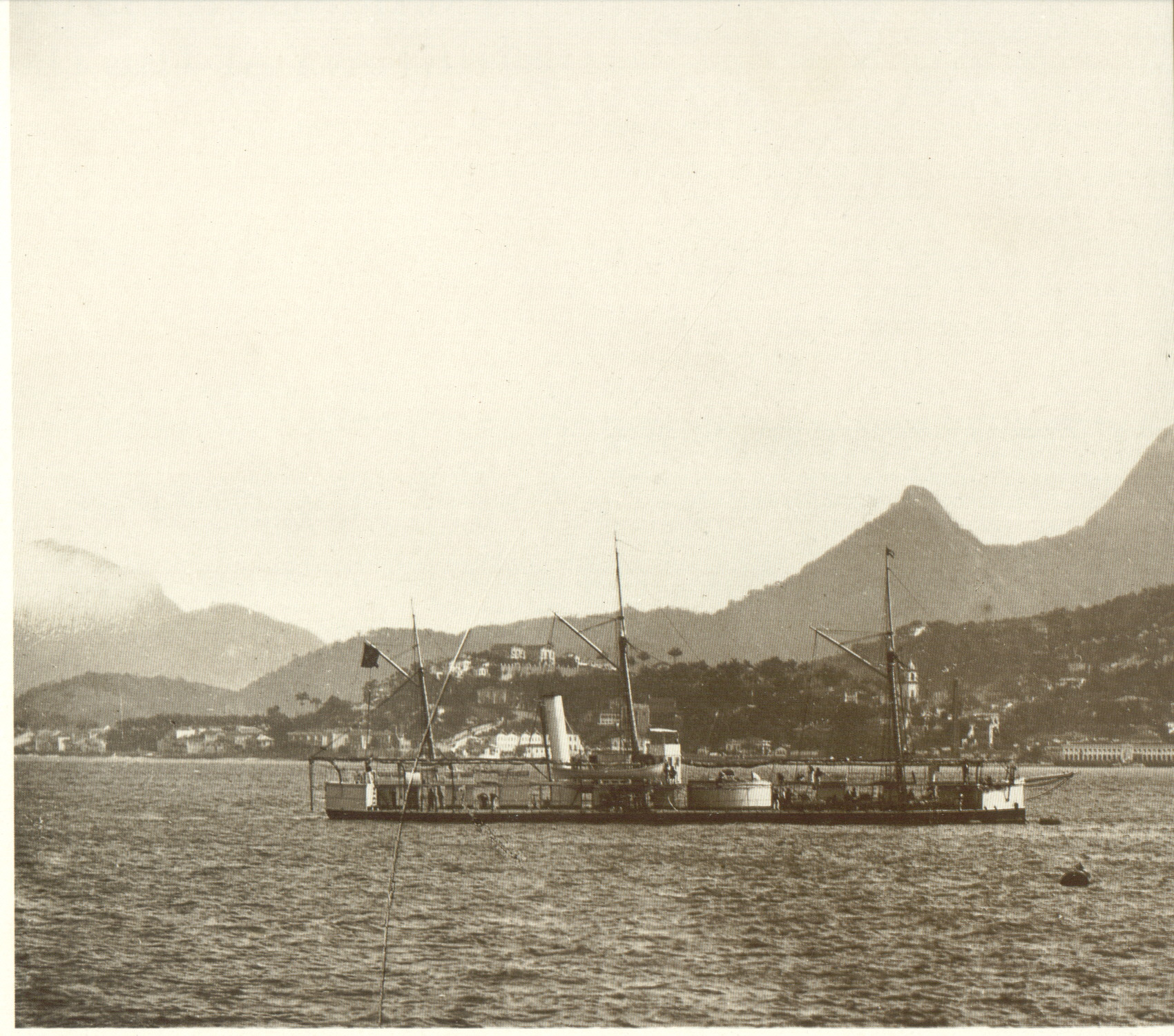
Ironclad Bahia, 1865.

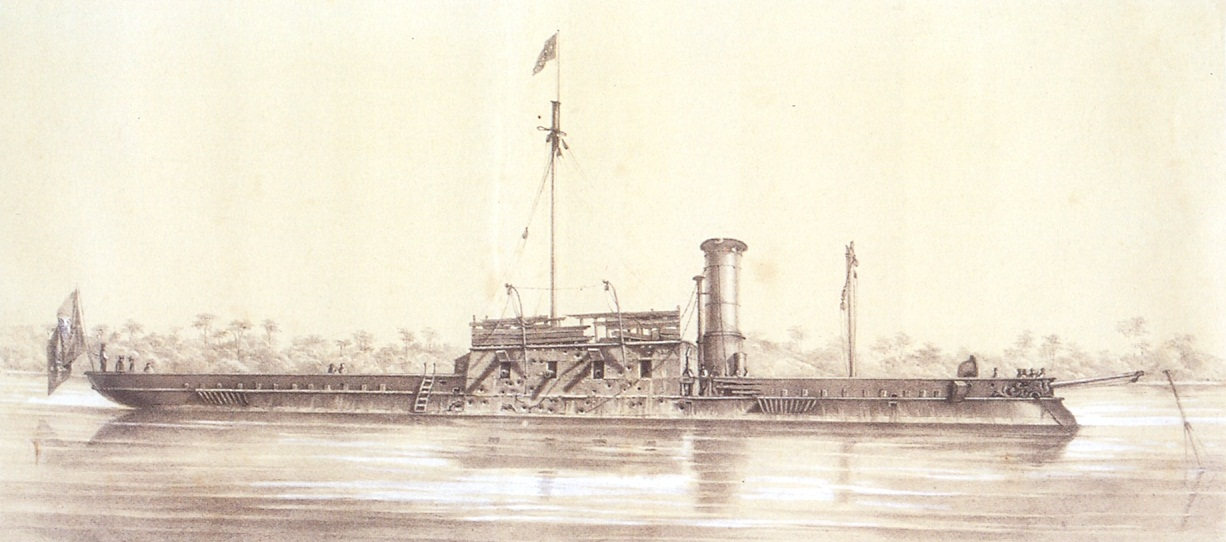
Ironclad Brasil seriously damaged after the attack on the Curuzú Fort, 1866.

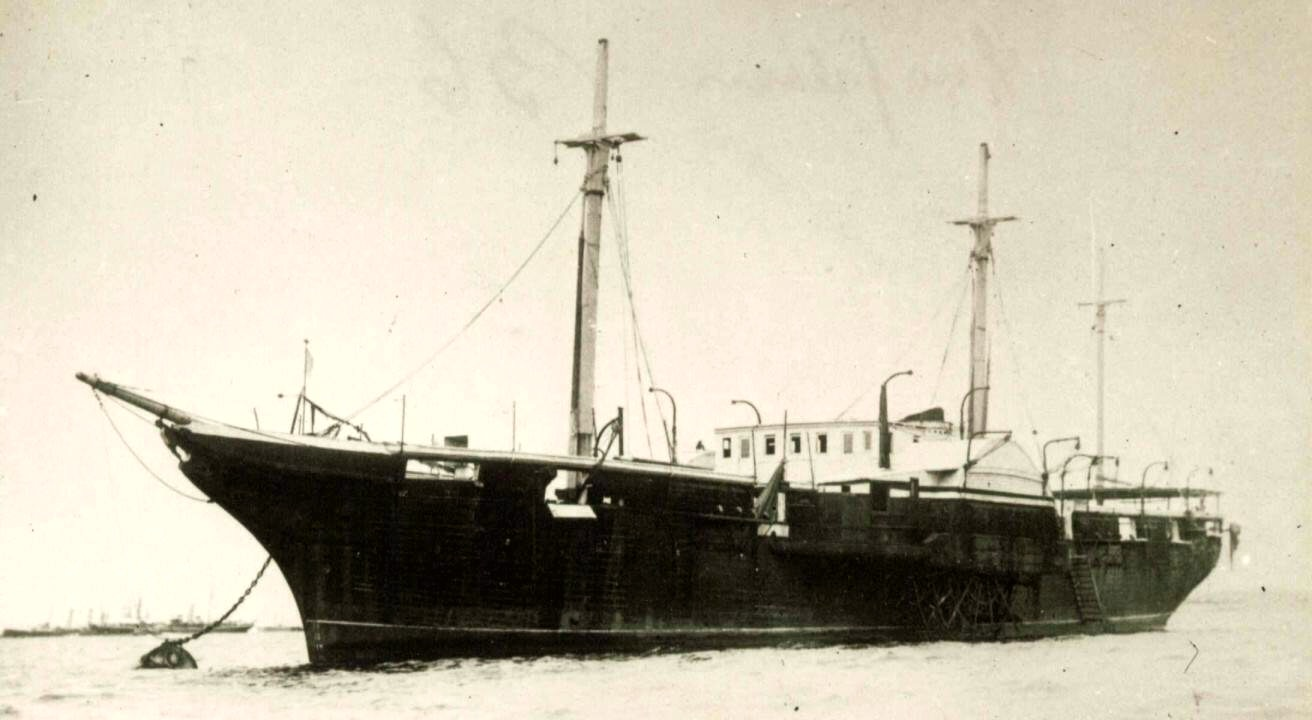
Steam frigate Amazonas, 1870.

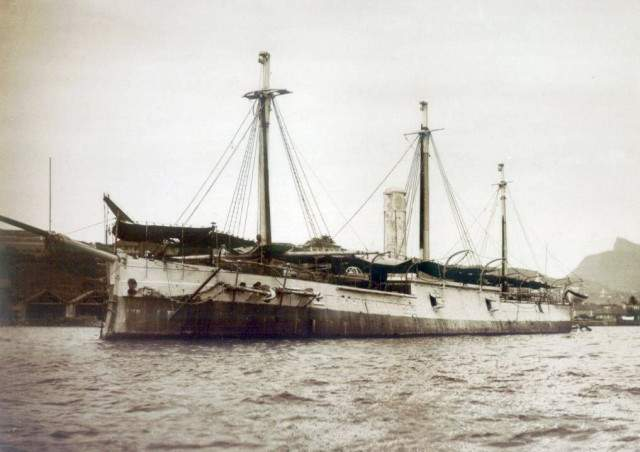
Ironclad Sete de Setembro, 1874.

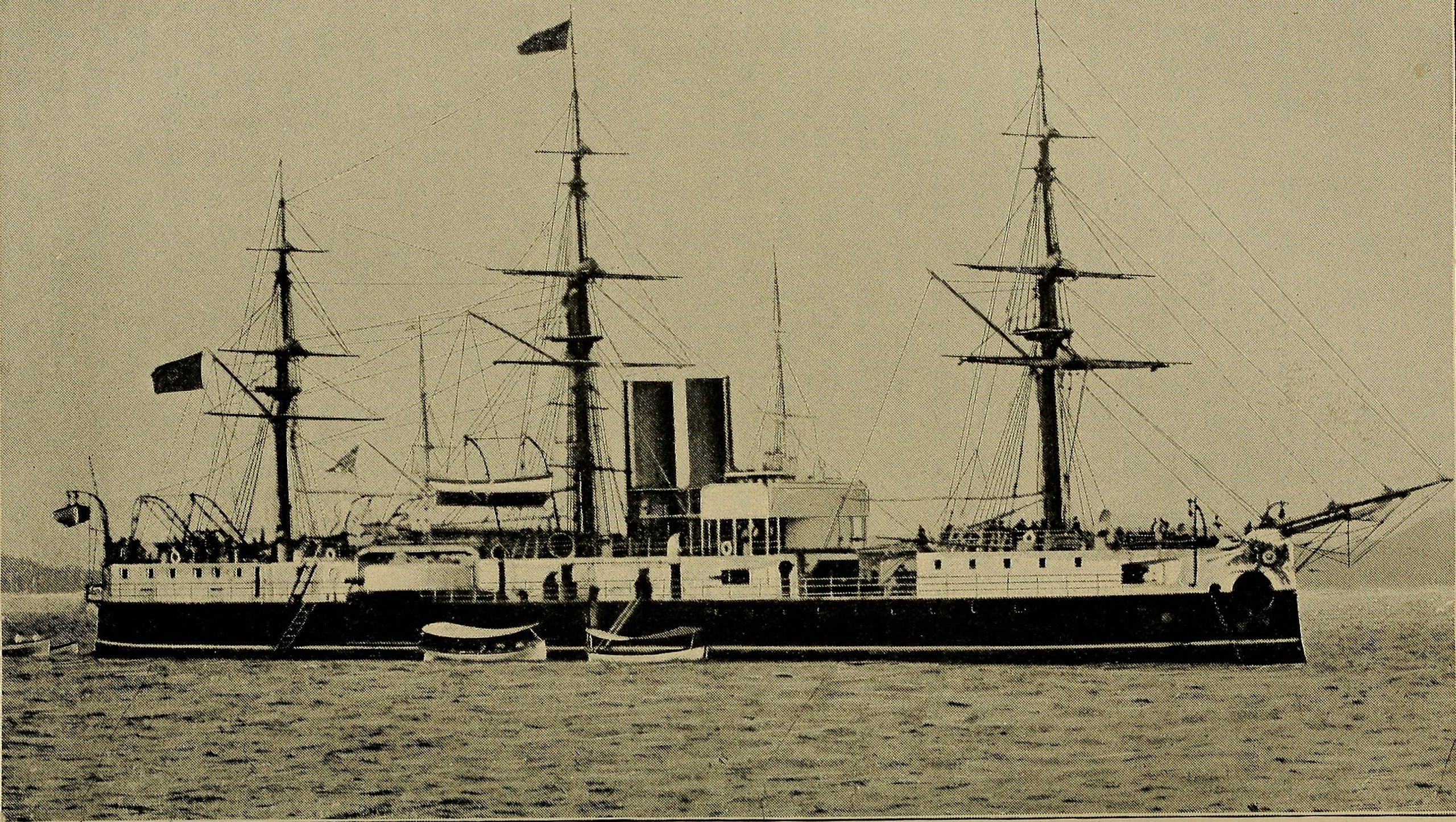
Battleship Riachuelo, 1885.

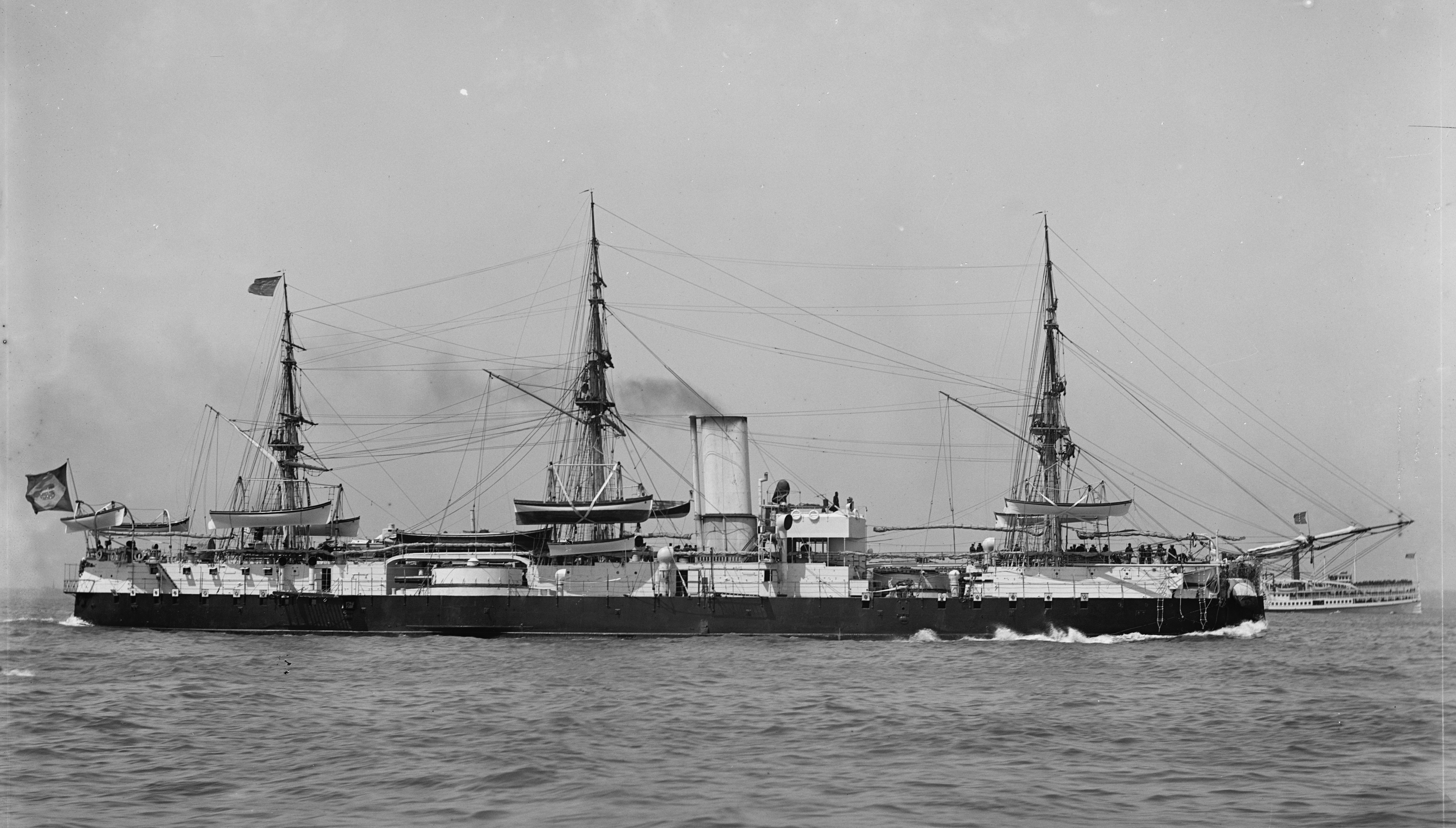
Battleship Aquidabã, 1893.

== Army ==
=== Early years, 1822–31 ===
The National Army, or Imperial Army during the monarchy, was divided into two branches: the 1st Line, which was the Army itself; and the 2nd Line, which was formed by the Militias and Orderlies inherited from the colonial times. When the Portuguese military in the provinces of the Bahia, Maranhão, Pará and Cisplatine refused to join the Independence cause, Emperor Pedro I reorganized the troops at his disposal for the imminent conflict. Most of the personnel stationed in the country remained loyal to the monarch, who made use of troops, equipment and forts for the war operations. The terrestrial force efficiently fought in the north and the south of Brazil, defeating the loyal troops of Portugal. In 1824 the Army of the 1st Line included 24,000 men, who were disciplined, trained and equipped just as well as European equivalents. At the end of the war of Independence, the Brazilian armed forces were already well organized and equipped. This occurred mainly because Pedro I heavily supported the Army. In the same year a battalion was sent to Pernambuco where it successfully quelled the revolt of the Confederation of the Equator.

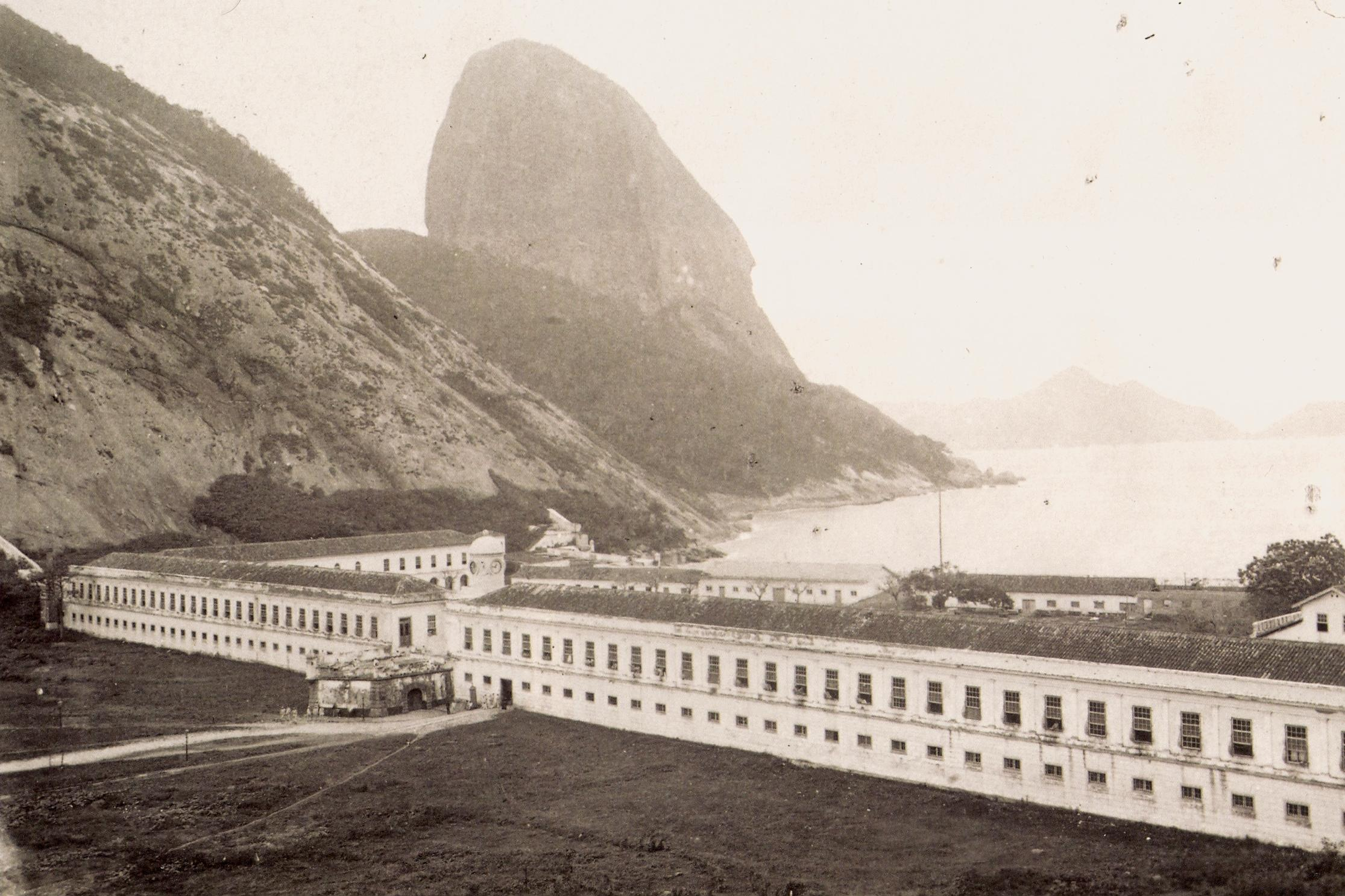
Military College (known before as Military Academy) in Rio de Janeiro, 1888.

Army officers' training was completed in the Military Academy (now Academia Militar de Agulhas Negras, also the only engineering school in Brazil up to 1874), although it was not obligatory for personnel to study there to advance in the profession. Personnel from the infantry and cavalry branches only needed to study the disciplines of the 1st year (arithmetic, algebra, geometry, trigonometry and technical drawing) and 5th year (tactical, strategy, camping, fortification in campaign, terrain reconnaissance and chemistry). Engineers and artillerymen were obliged to study the complete course, which resulted in their branches being considered the most prestigious. However, if they preferred, infantrymen and cavalrymen were allowed to study the disciplines of the 2nd year (algebra, geometry, analytical geometry, differential and integral calculus, descriptive geometry and technical drawing); 3rd year (mechanics, ballistics and technical drawing); 4th year (spherical trigonometry, physics, astronomy, geodesy, geography and technical drawing); 6th year (regular and irregular fortification, attacking and defending strongholds, civil architecture, roads, ports, canals, mineralogy and technical drawing); and 7th year (artillery, mines and natural history).

The Empire declared war against the United Provinces of the Río de la Plata (now Argentina) in 1825 because that nation was aiding the secessionist revolt of the Brazilian province of Cisplatine. The Argentine and the Cisplatine secessionist troops made use of guerrilla tactics that prevented the much stronger Brazilian Army (1st Line with 27,242 men and 2nd Line with 95,000) from delivering an overwhelming blow against its enemies. By the end of the conflict more than 8,000 Brazilians had died and the esteem associated with a career in the military declined. In the aftermath, the military blamed the Emperor for not being able to convince the Parliament to allow more financial aid to purchase equipment, munitions and provisions, while the liberals, on the other hand, considered the monarch responsible for the high costs of the conflict.

=== Quelling rebellions, 1831–49 ===
Pedro I's abdication resulted in the reduction of the size of the Army contingent. The liberals were against the Army for ideological and economic reasons. Their objective was to prevent any possibility of return to Brazil by Pedro I, so they weakened one of the institutions most connected to the former Emperor. Some battalions were dissolved while others were transferred to distant provinces. Most of the soldiers were discharged; enlistment was suspended and the promotion of any officer was forbidden. On 30 August 1831, the liberal regency reduced the Army to fewer than 10,000 men. Later reductions left only 6,000 soldiers. The battalions formed by mercenaries were also disbanded.

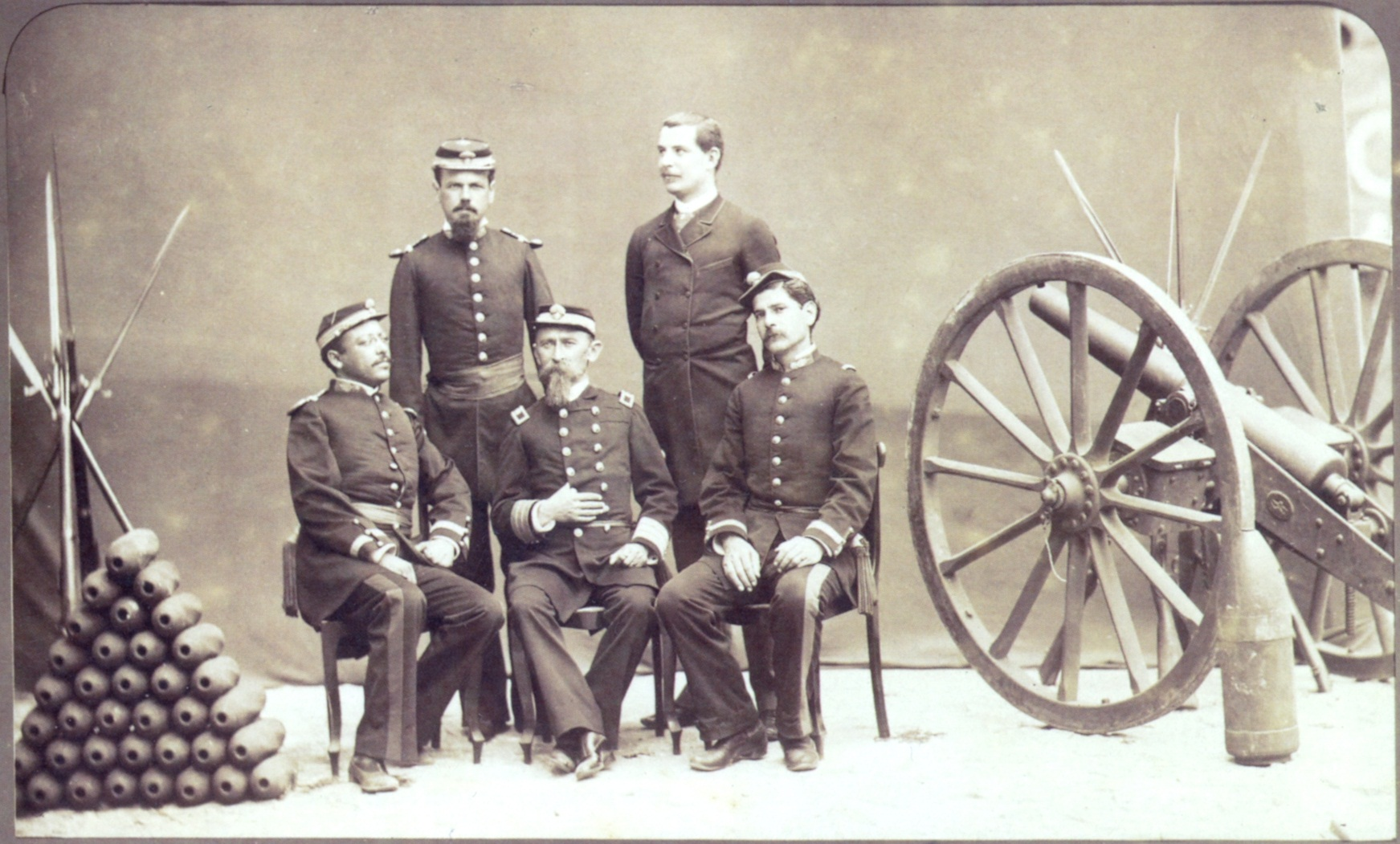
Officers of the Imperial Army next to a cannon, 1886.

With the intention of assisting the smaller Army, the Government created the National Guard on 18 August 1831. The new institution would substitute for the old Militias and Orderlies that were extinguished at the same time. The National Guard was composed of all male Brazilians who had an annual income superior to Rs 200$000 (the same value as an elector). The majority of the male population had to meet certain conditions to be part of the National Guard: someone who worked as a craftsman or clerk satisfied the minimum requirements. Even the "ingenuous" (free children of slaves or ex-slaves) were allowed to enlist in the force. The Guard's members were not remunerated and, except for weapons which the Government supplied, the members had to pay all expenses related to uniforms and equipment. However, the Guard's members had little if any military skill and they were completely inadequate for the wars of the Industrial Age. The Guard did not have permanent troops nor barracks for lodging troops. In war times the National Guard was incorporated into the Army of 1st Line and it was, for all effects, a reserve force of the Imperial Army.

The results of the Liberal's policy towards the Army were soon felt. The Government was incapable of fighting the rebellions that occurred in the country during the second half of the 1830s. The election of the conservative Pedro de Araújo Lima for the office of regent in 1837 completely changed the situation. The Conservative Party restored the Army, reorganized and reequipped its ranks, and increased its size to 18,000 men. The Imperial Army achieved several victories over the provincial revolts, including: Cabanagem, Sabinada, Ragamuffin War, among others. At the beginning of the 1840s a new reorganization of the Army gave it more cohesion and made it more capable.

=== Platine Wars, 1849–70 ===
In 1845 the Military College (originally known as the Military Academy) was divided into two-halves: one half retained the name "Military College" and the other half became the Central College. A new reform (Decree nº 585) on 6 September 1850, considerably improved the quality of the officers of the Imperial Army. From then on, progression in a soldier's military career would occur through antiquity, merit and academic resume, beyond a clear preference for the personnel who completed the Military College over the ones who did not. On 20 September 1851, the conservative cabinet created a branch of the Military College in Porto Alegre. The Porto Alegre college location provided courses in infantry and cavalry, including disciplines taken from the 1st and 5th years of study. The National Guard was reorganized in the same month and became subordinate directly to the Minister of Justice, instead of to the locally elected Judges of Peace. In 1851 the Imperial Army was composed of more than 37,000 men and participated in the Platine War, in which it defeated the Argentine Confederation with the contribution of Uruguayan troops and Argentine rebels.

Year	Army (1st Line)	Army (2nd Line)
1824	24,000	Unknown
1827	27,242	95,000
1832	6,000	Unknown
1838	18,000	Unknown
1851	37,000	Unknown
1864	18,000	440,000
1869	82,271	Unknown
1875	17,000	Unknown
1883	13,000	Unknown
1889	14,300	Unknown

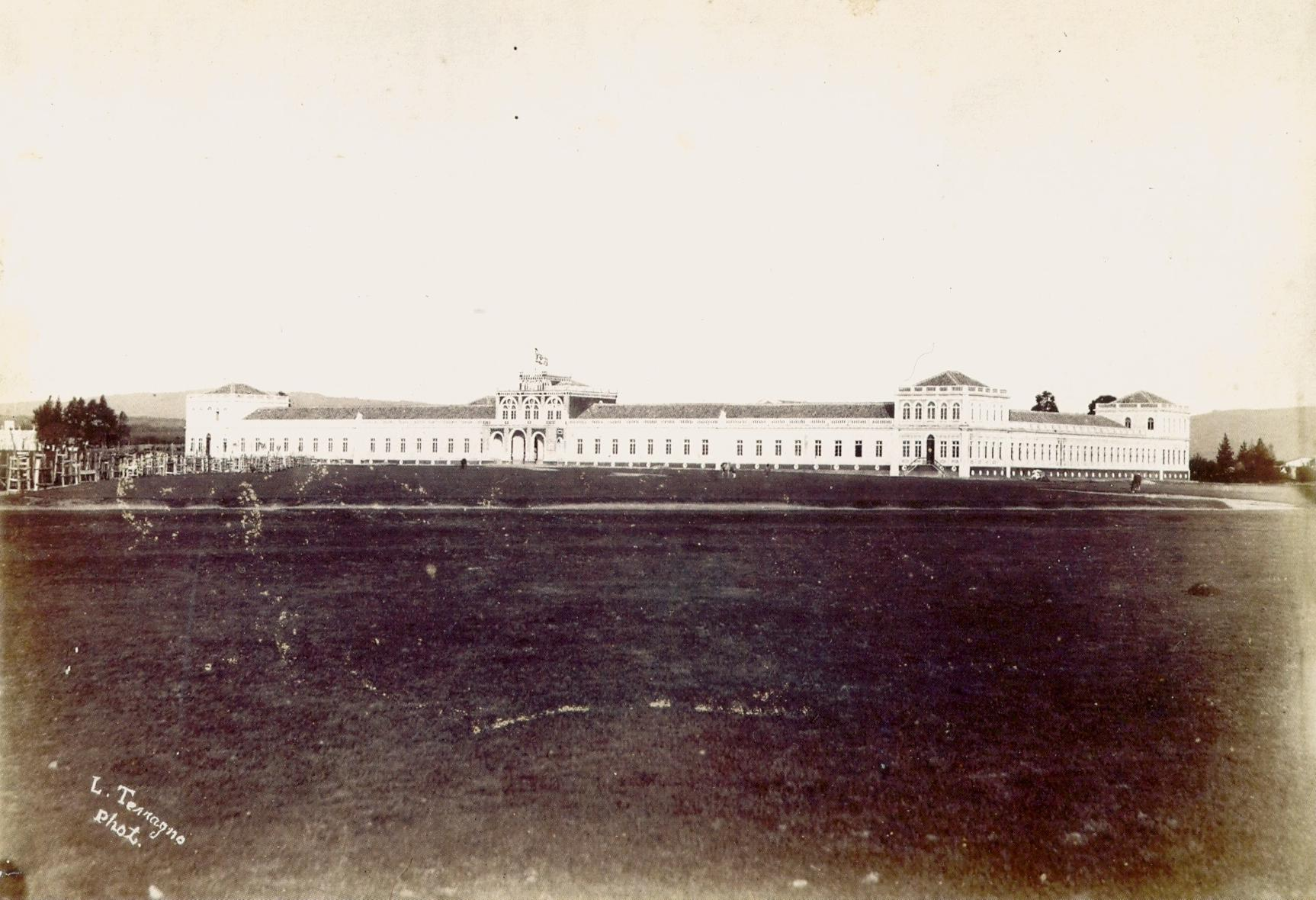
Military College in Porto Alegre, 1885.

The Uruguayan War (which was followed by the Paraguayan War) revealed the complete neglect subjected on the Imperial Army after 1852. The Army did not have enough equipment, ammunition, uniforms or transportation. With only 18,000 men in 1864 it was necessary to search for reserve forces to collaborate with the war effort. In 1864 the National Guard enrollment was 440,000 men. In spite of the impressive numbers, the Guard's military potential was considerably reduced by their lack of training and equipment and the resistance by most Guard members to deployment to the theater of operations. From then on the National Guard would be gradually put aside in favor of the Army. The Fatherland Volunteer Corps was created on 7 January 1865. The Corps received volunteer and conscripted Brazilians. The nomination of the Marquis of Caxias as the commander of the Imperial Army in the middle of 1866 put an end to the anarchy. In 1865 18,000 men were deployed in enemy territory. This number grew to 67,365 in 1866; 71,039 in 1867; and finally 82,271 in 1869.

The Marquis of Caxias reorganized the troops who received uniforms, equipment and weapons equal in quality to those of the Prussian Army. The health service of the armed forces was inferior to American Civil War health care, but was superior to Crimean War health programs. The armed conflict lasted for more than five years and cost the lives of 50,000 Brazilians. However, the Empire attained victory and maintained its supremacy over the rest of South America. The Imperial Army mobilized 154,996 men for the war, divided into the following categories: 10,025 Army personnel who were in Uruguay in 1864; 2,047 in the province of Mato Grosso; 55,985 Fatherland Volunteers; 60,009 National Guardsmen; 8,570 ex-slaves; and an additional 18,000 National Guardsmen who remained in Brazil to defend their homeland.

=== Final years, 1870–89 ===
In 1873, the role of the National Guard was restricted when it was decided that the Guard would no longer act as a police force. As a result, the National Guard effectively became a reserve force of the Army. However, its definitive dissolution did not occur until 1918. In 1874 the Polytechnical College of Rio de Janeiro was created from the Military School. The new college focused on the provision of civil engineering courses. For the 1873–74 fiscal year, the Government allocated about 27 percent of the budget for the Army and the Armada.

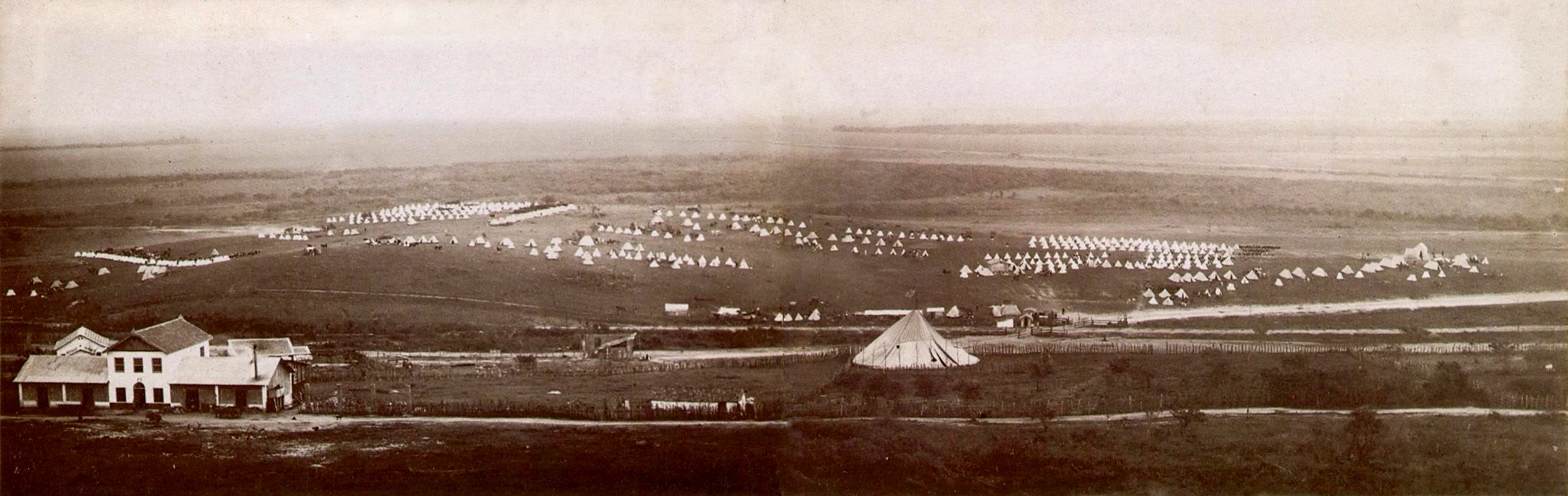
Military camp of the Imperial Army, 1885.

A new generation of turbulent and undisciplined military personnel began to appear at the beginning of the 1880s, because the old monarchist officers, such as Luis Alves de Lima e Silva (Duke of Caxias), Polidoro da Fonseca Quintanilha Jordão (Viscount of Santa Teresa), Antônio de Sampaio, Manuel Marques de Sousa (Count of Porto Alegre) and Manuel Luis Osório (Marquis of Herval) were dead. In an Army with only 13,000 men, 7,526 were sent to jail in 1884 for bad behavior. The cadets in the Military College learned about Positivism and discussed politics while completely ignoring military matters. These men advocated the establishment of a military dictatorship. In 1882, Army military officers murdered a journalist in broad day light when he criticized the behavior of the Army. The murder went unpunished. The republicans stimulated the undisciplined behavior of these personnel during 1887 and 1888 by alleging a lack of attention and consideration on the part of the Government towards the Army.

On 15 November 1889, the monarchy was overthrown by Army troops led by Field Marshal Deodoro da Fonseca who became the leader of the first Brazilian dictatorship. Marshal Câmara (Viscount of Pelotas), affirmed that about 20 percent of the Imperial Army supported the coup. In the following days several battalions of the Army, which were spread across the country, fought against republican forces with the intention of stopping the coup. In Desterro (now Florianópolis), the 25th Infantry Battalion attacked the Republican Club on 17 November 1889. A month later on 18 December, in Rio de Janeiro, the 2nd Artillery Regiment tried to restore the monarchy. In 1893, Monarchist soldiers participated in the Federalist Revolution with the intention of restoring the Empire. The Monarchists who did not die in battle were imprisoned, deported or murdered.

== See also ==
- List of generals of the Empire of Brazil
- Military history of Brazil
- List of wars involving Brazil
