= Military ranks of the Empire of Brazil =

The military ranks of the Empire of Brazil were a rank system used by the Armed Forces of the Empire of Brazil.

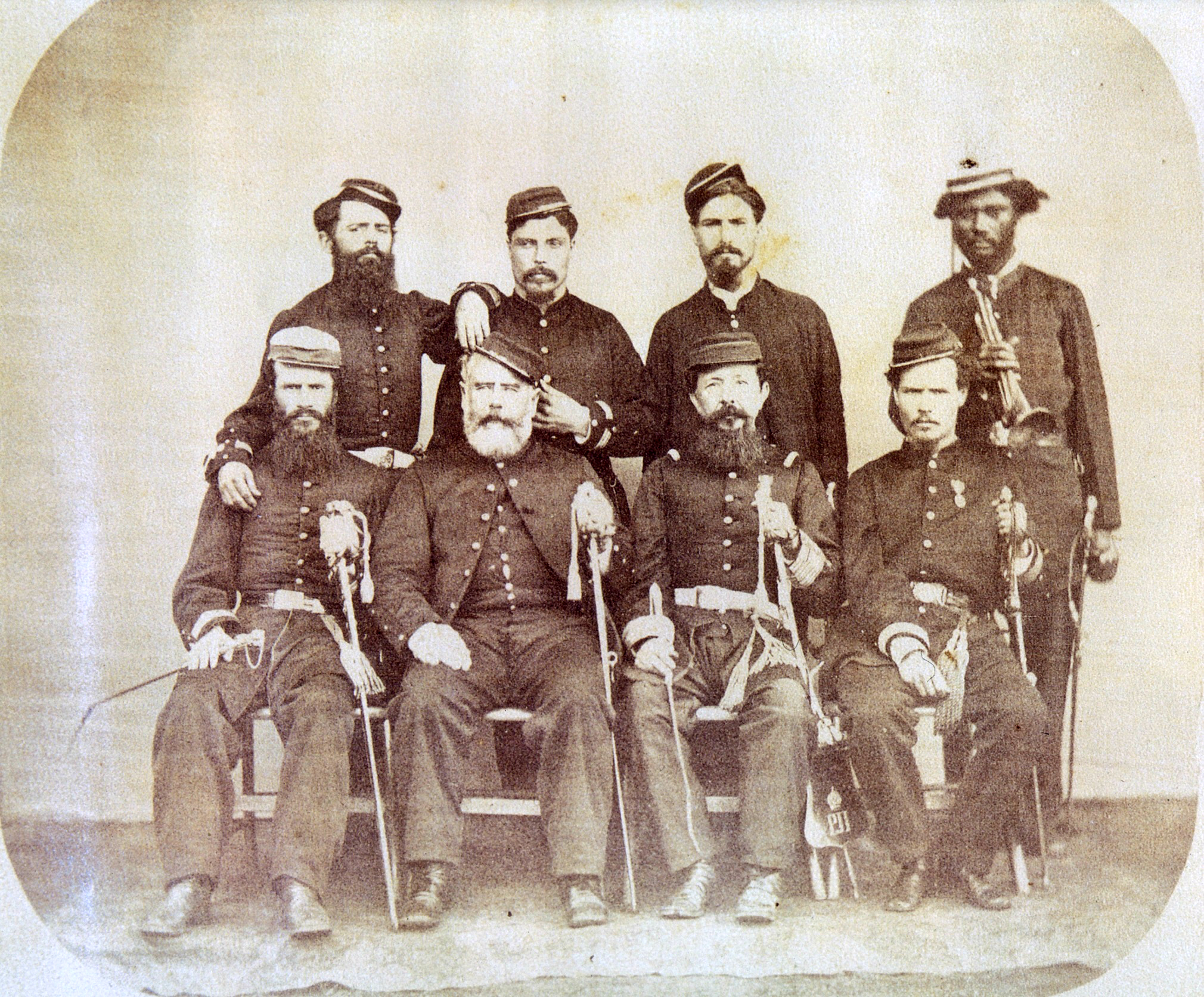
Officers and NCOs of the Paraguayan War

== Imperial Army ==
The rank insignia of the Estado-Maior General (General/Flag officers) were established by Imperial Decree of 7 October 1823. They bore the leaves of an oak tree, similar to the ranks of the Portuguese Army of the early 1800s. The ranks for the Senior and Junior Officers were the same throughout Pedro II's reign.

=== Promotion ===
In 1850, a law regulating the promotion of officers in the Imperial Brazilian Army was approved. According to this legislation, to become an officer, one must have spent at least two years as a praça, and be at least 18 years old. This meant that to become an alferes, equivalent to a 2nd lieutenant, one had to be either a sergeant or a cadet with service time at lower rankings, not to mention the students from the Military School whose entrance to officership was handled by a separate legislation. To move up the rankings to captain, the officer must have spent two years serving as a tenente and two years as an alferes. Promotion off captain, after three years serving as one, would be as such: half of the officers promoted from major to coronel would be due to their service time, and the other for their accomplishments. On the other hand, promotion to the General Officers would only be granted for the accomplishments of the officer.

For the Praças however, to achieve promotion was based on whether the praça had volunteered or had been conscripted. José Iran Ribeiro, from the Federal University of Santa Maria, found out that, from a group of 15 volunteers, 9 had risen up to become sergeants 6 of them before reaching 20 years of age. For 16 conscripts, promotion to sergeant was achieved by 5 of them, 3 of them after their 25th birthday.

=== Paraguayan War ===
==== Officers ====
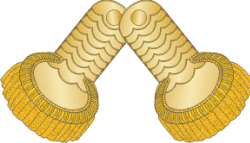
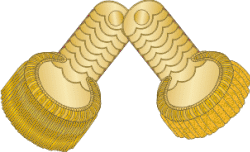
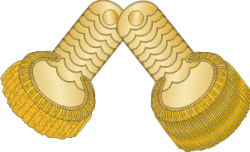
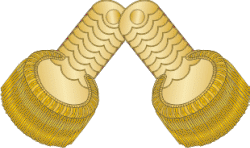
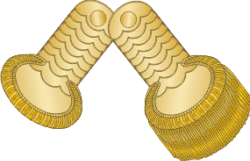
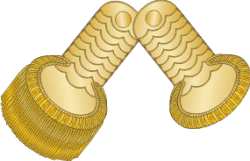
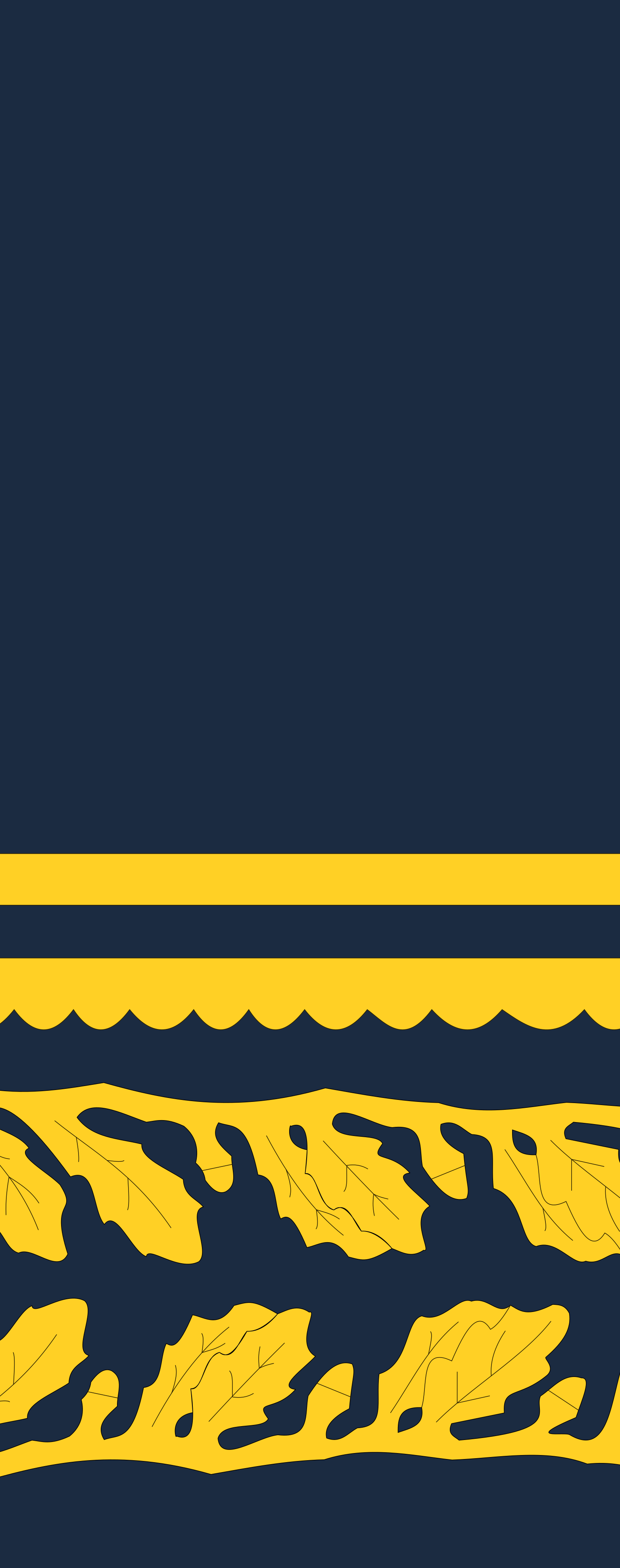
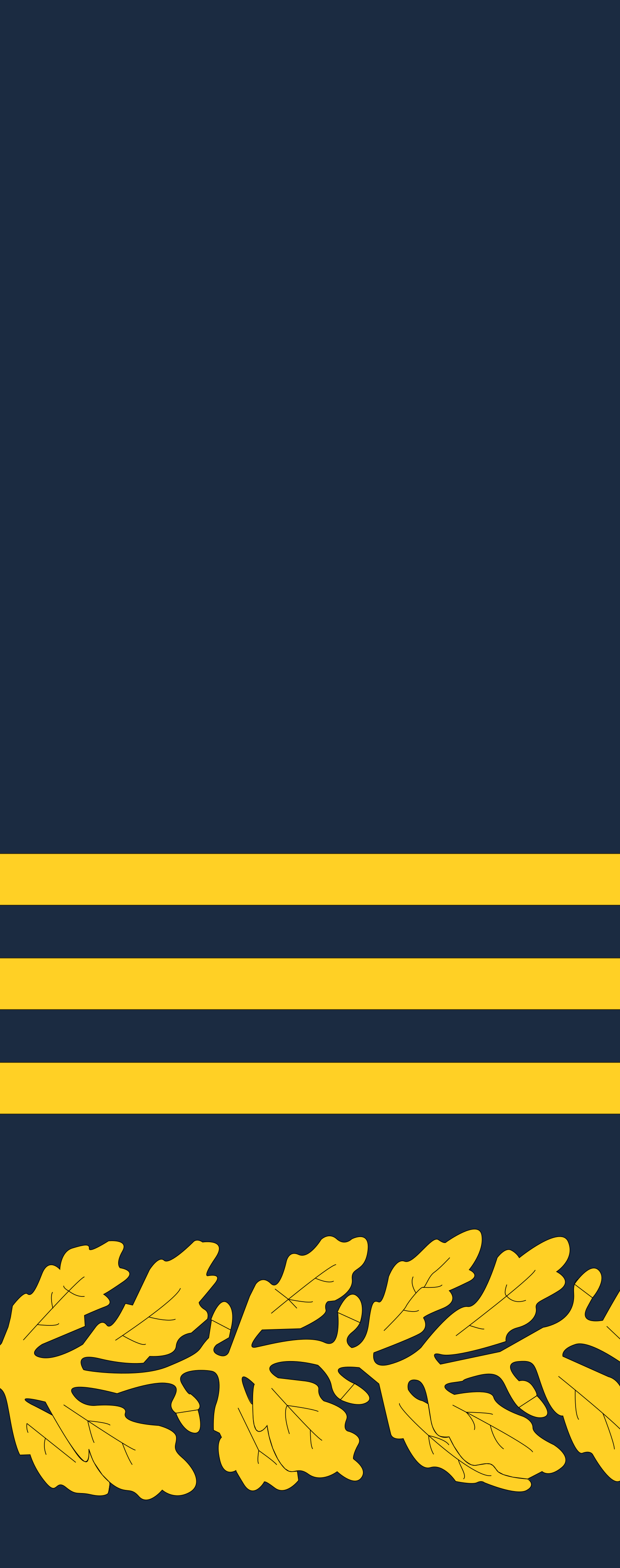
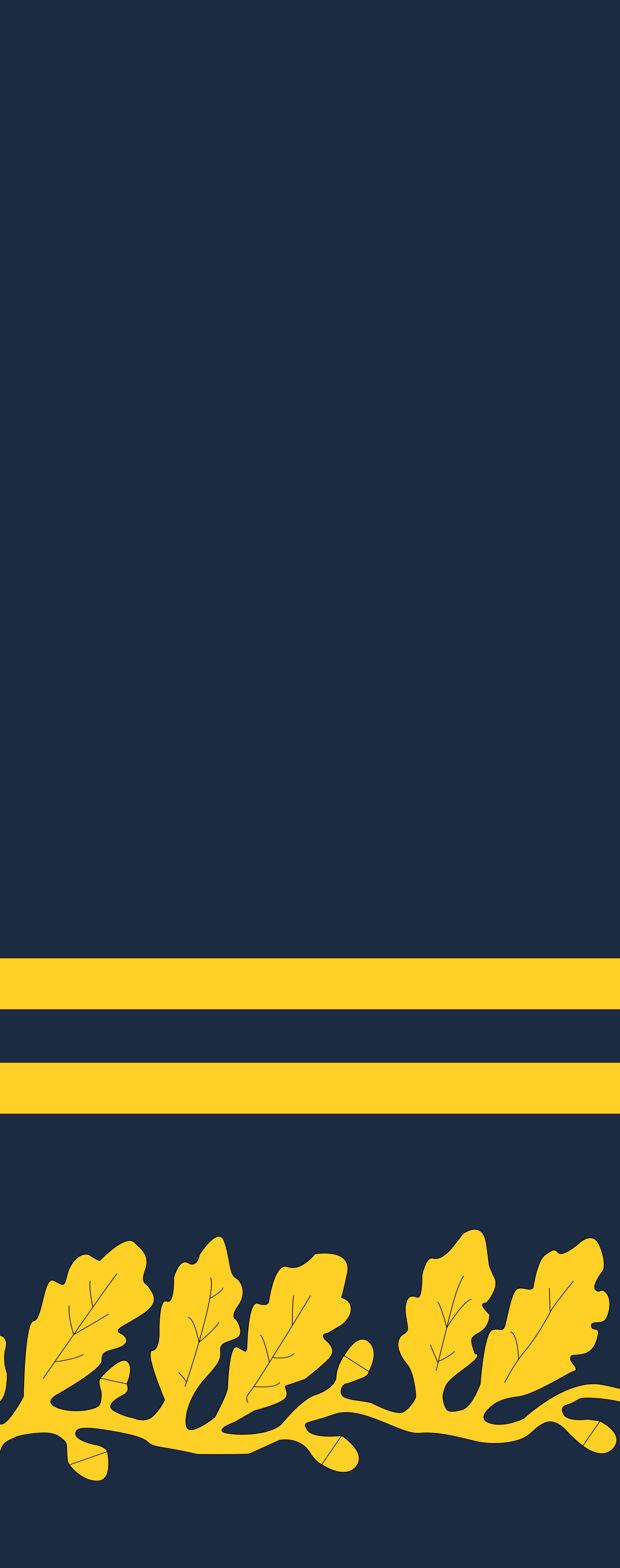
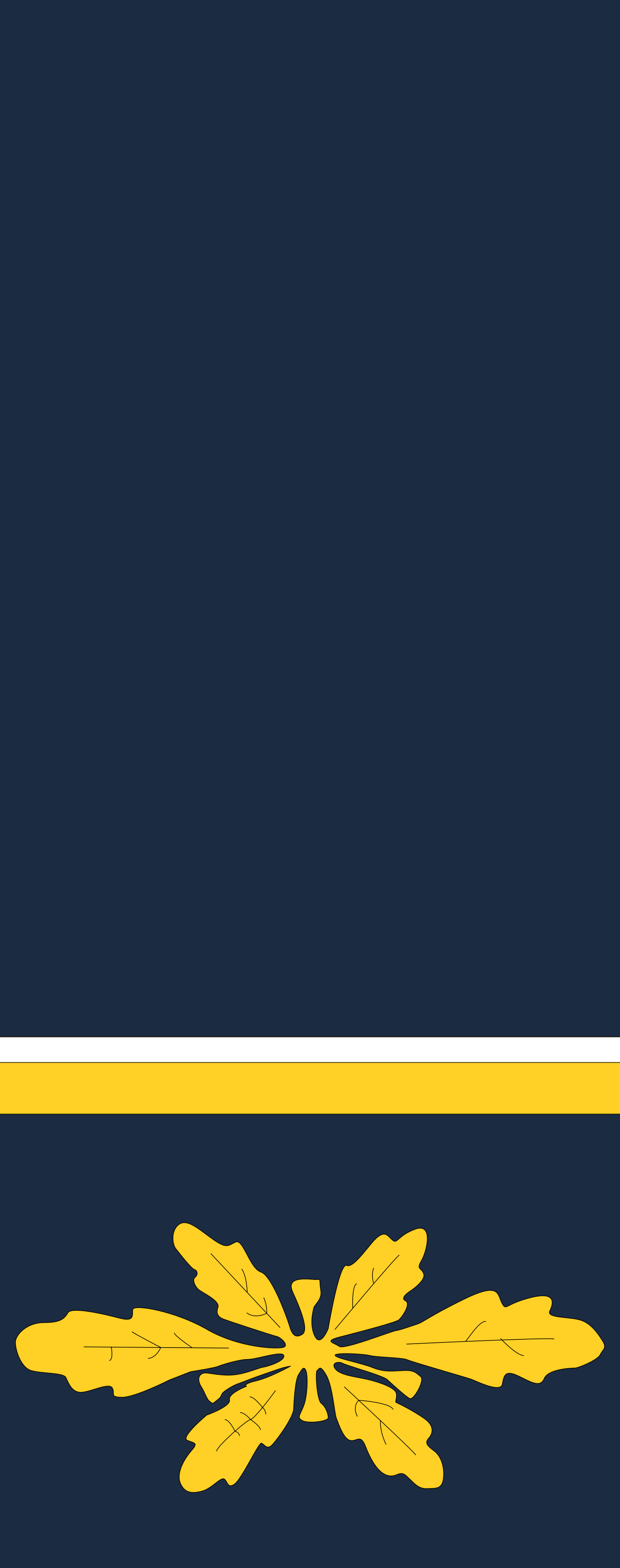
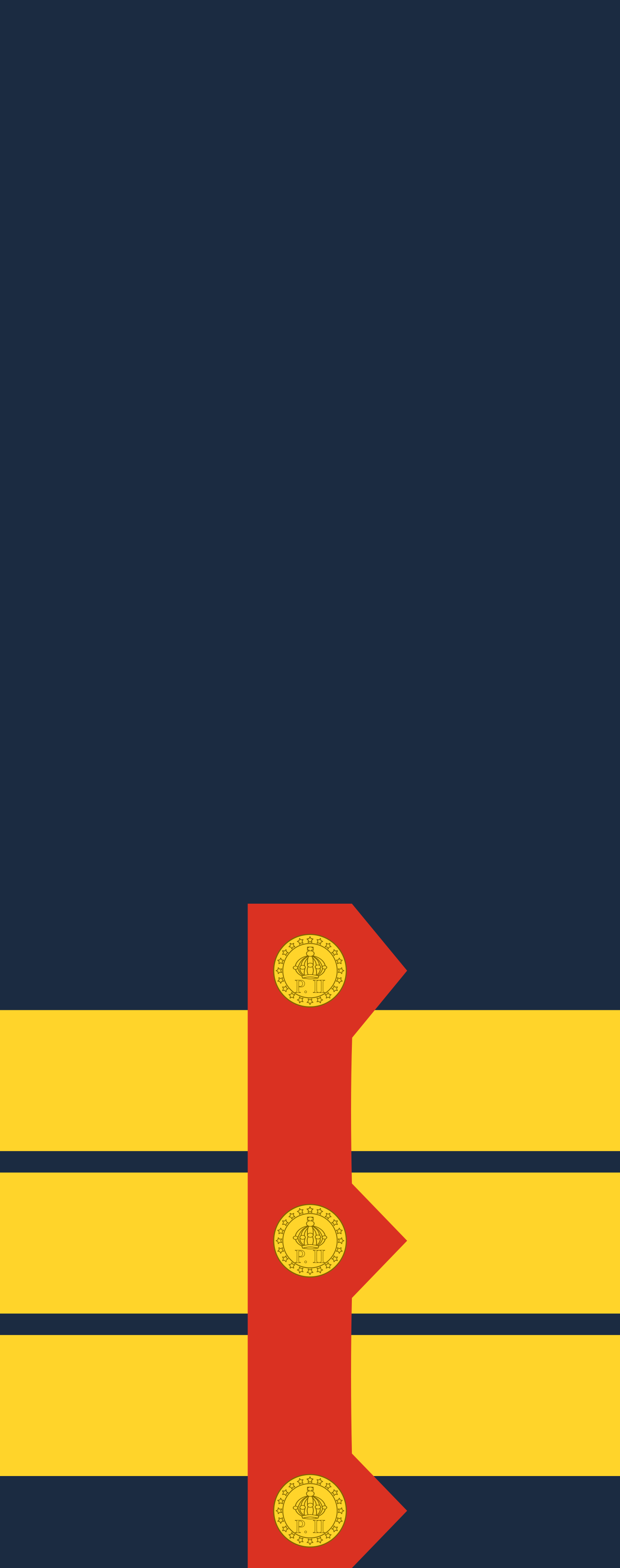
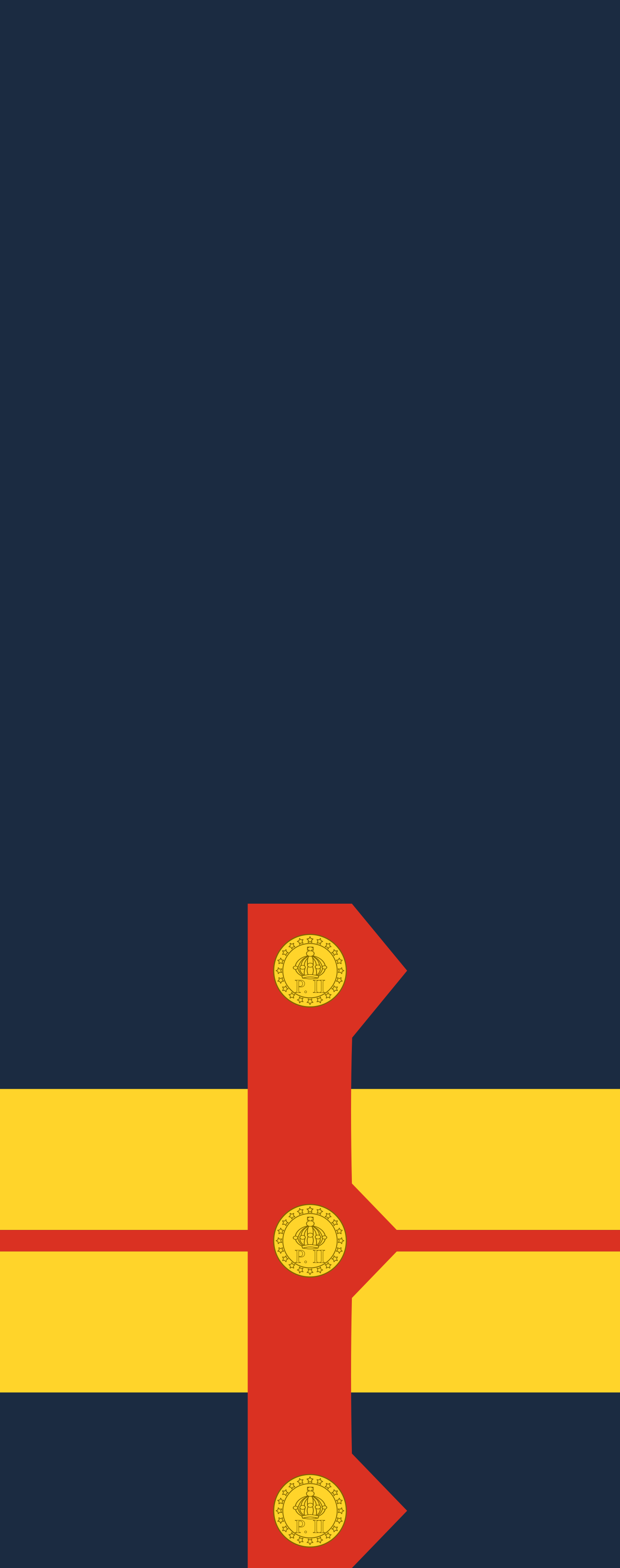
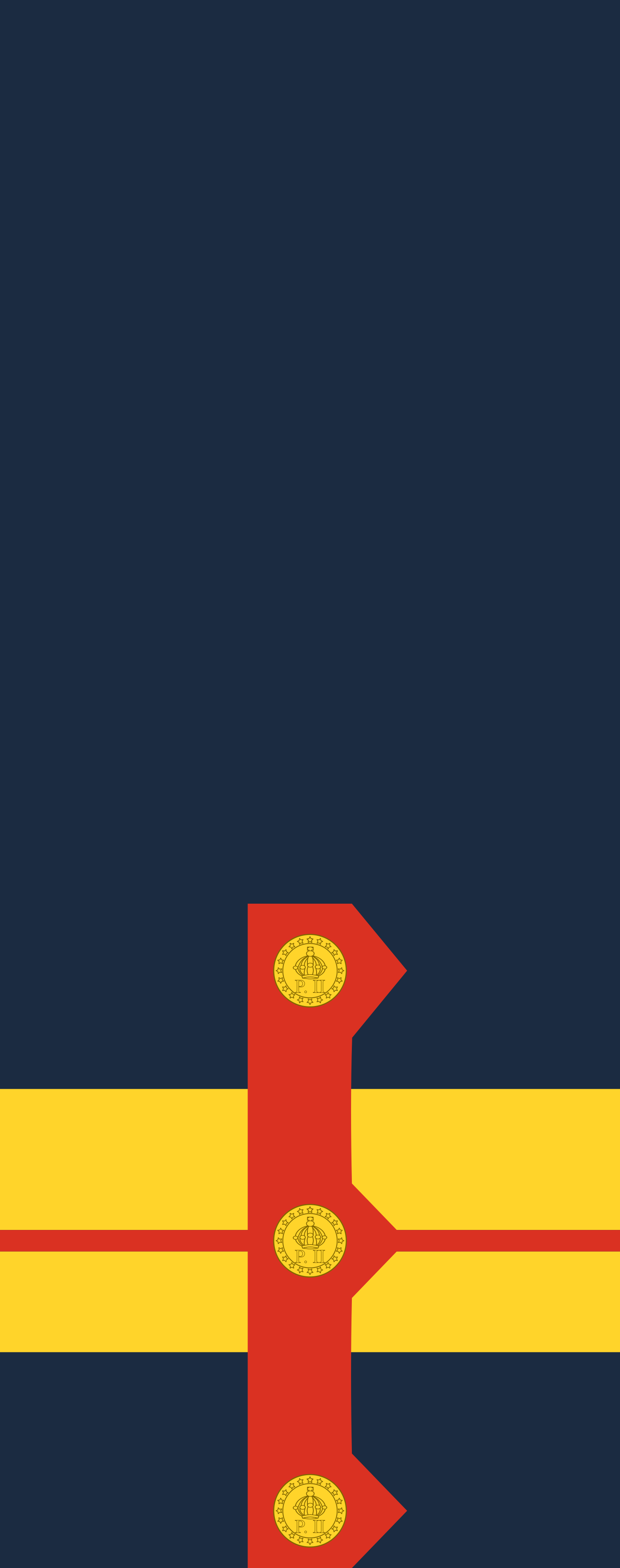
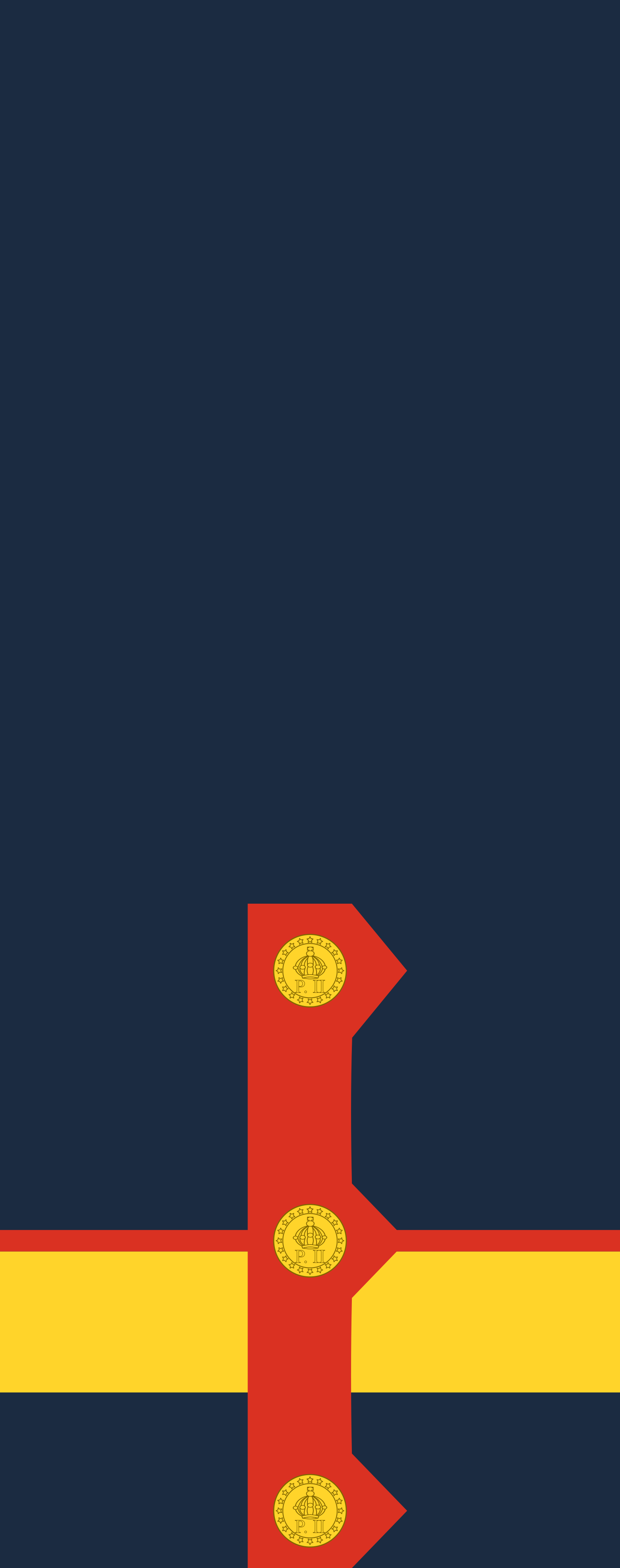
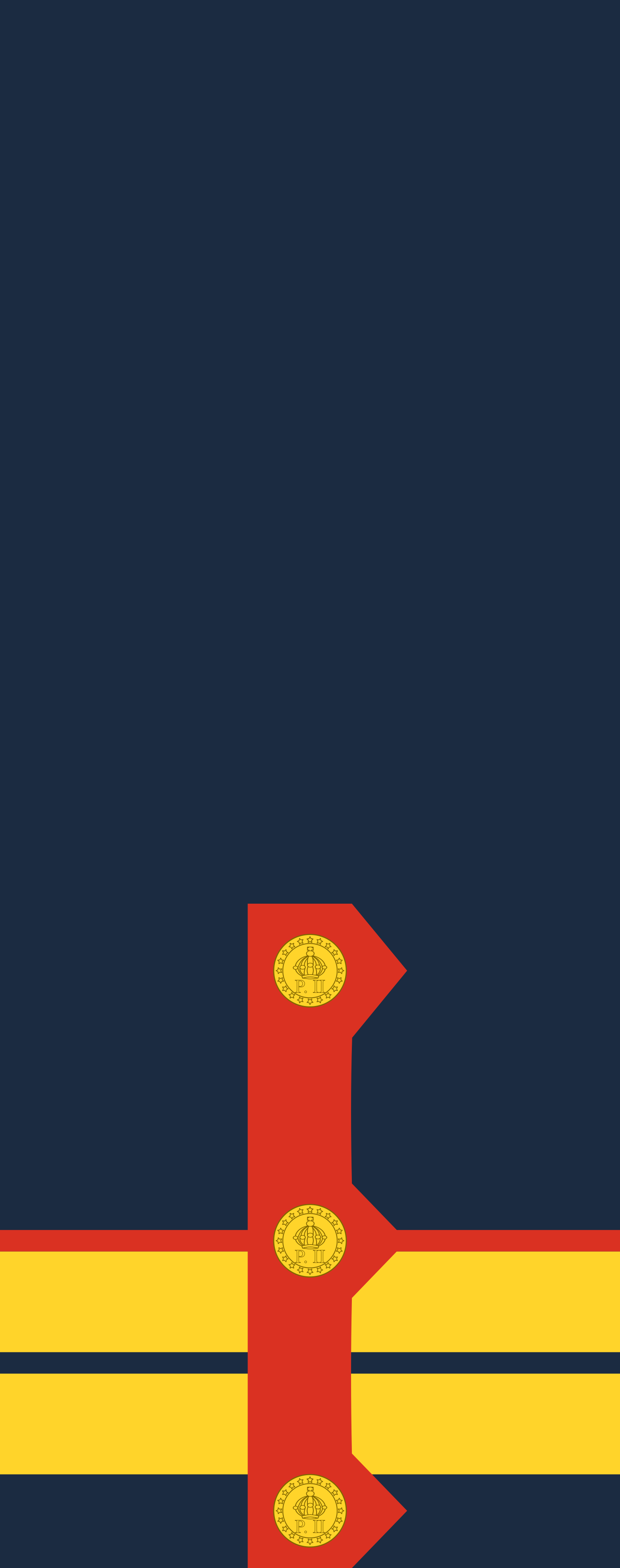
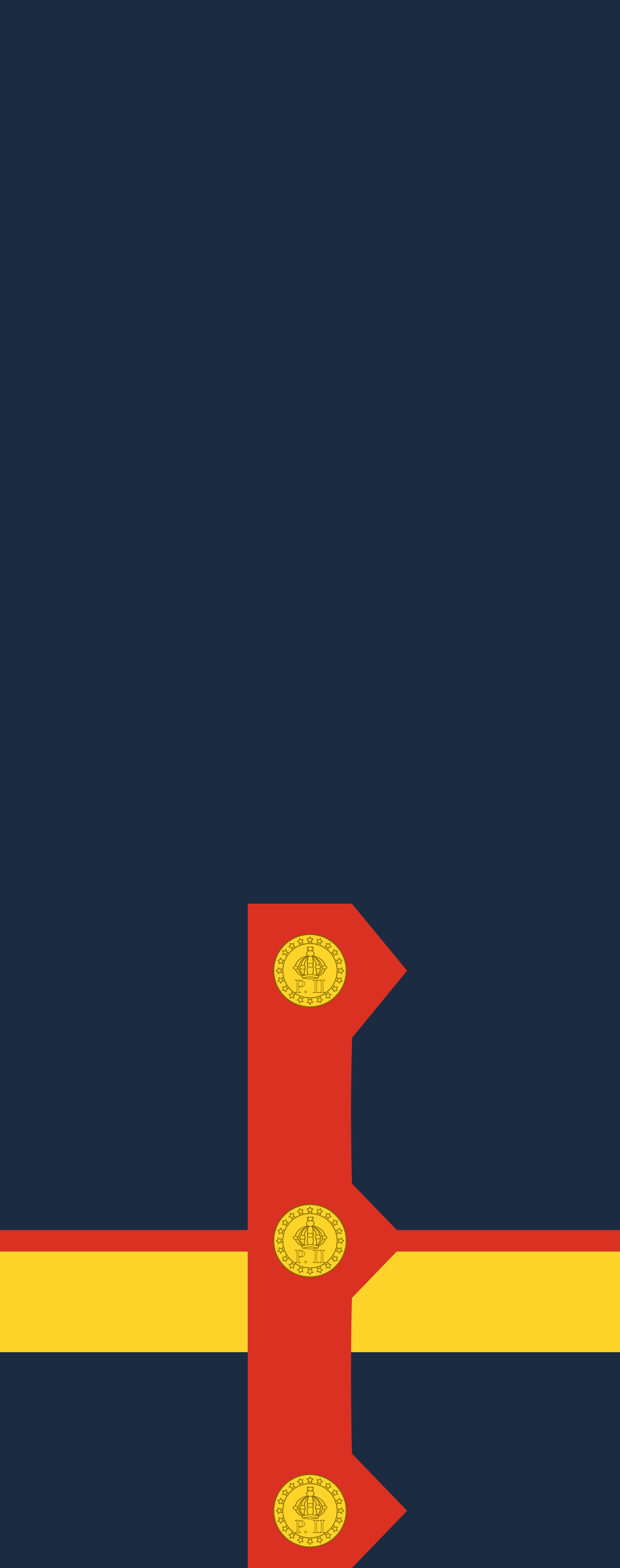
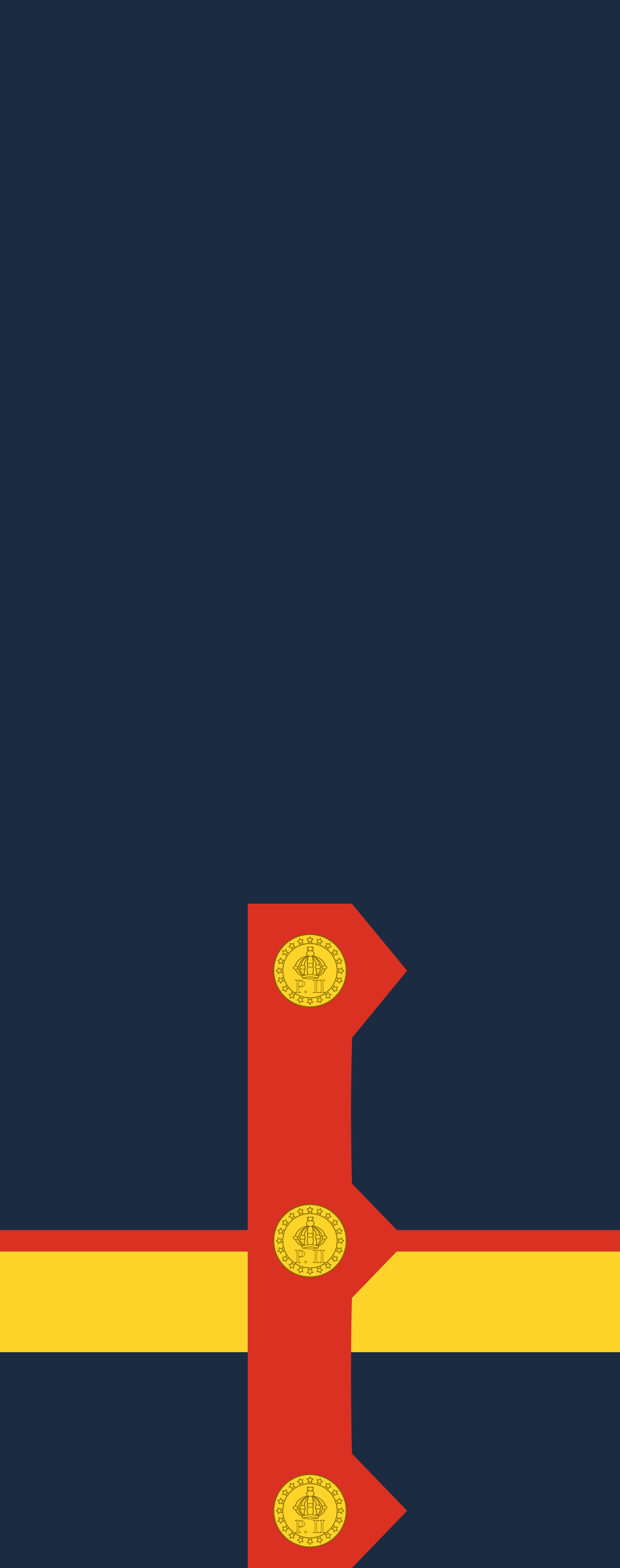
Rank group	General / flag officers				Senior officers			Junior officers
Epaulettes
Sleeve rank insignia
Name	Marechal de Exército	Tenente-general	Marechal de campo	Brigadeiro	Coronel	Tenente-coronel	Major	Capitão	Tenente	Alferes	Alferes-aluno

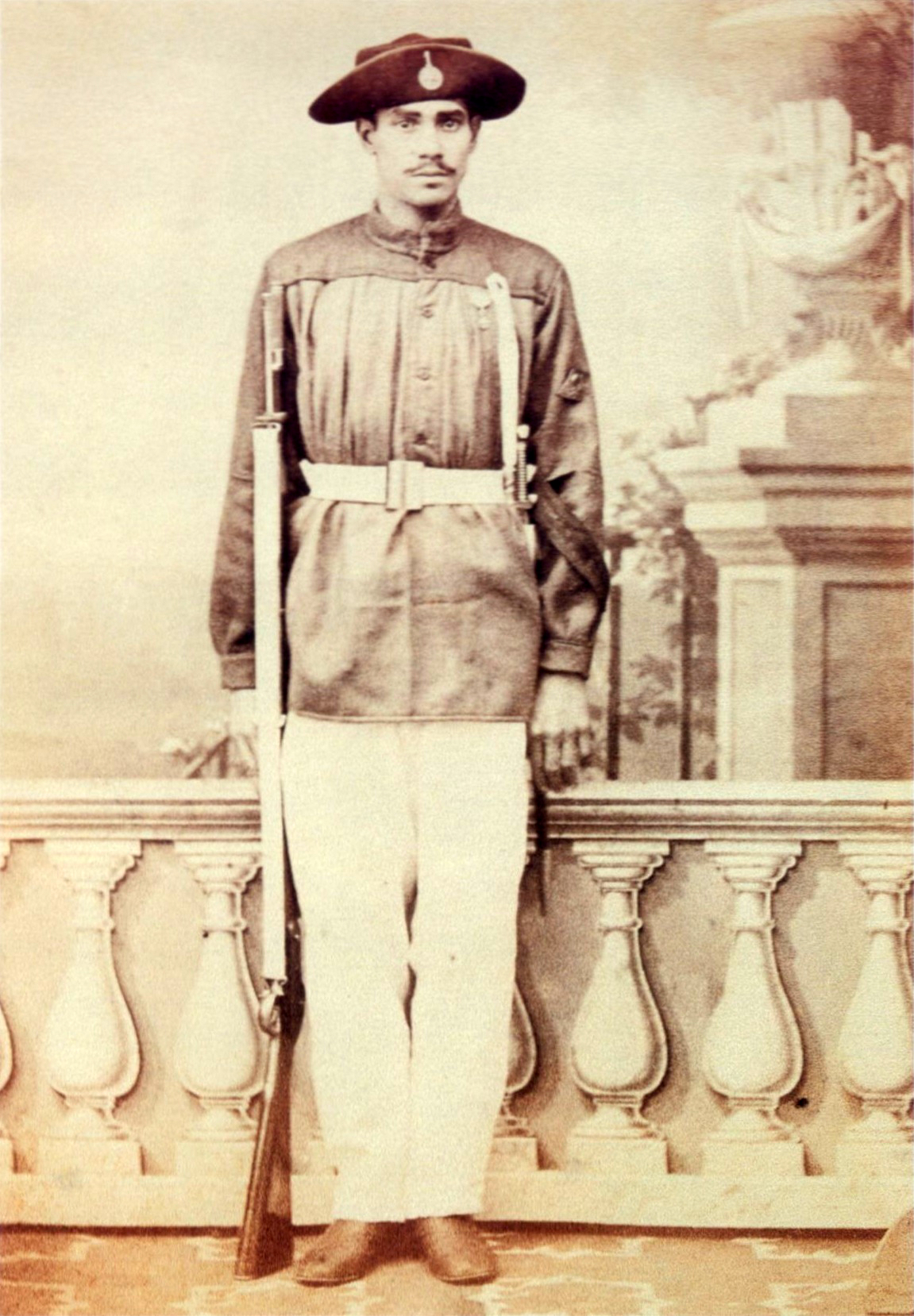
Furriel Luís Antônio de Vargas, of the 1st Homeland Volunteers Battalion during the Paraguayan War

==== Praças ====
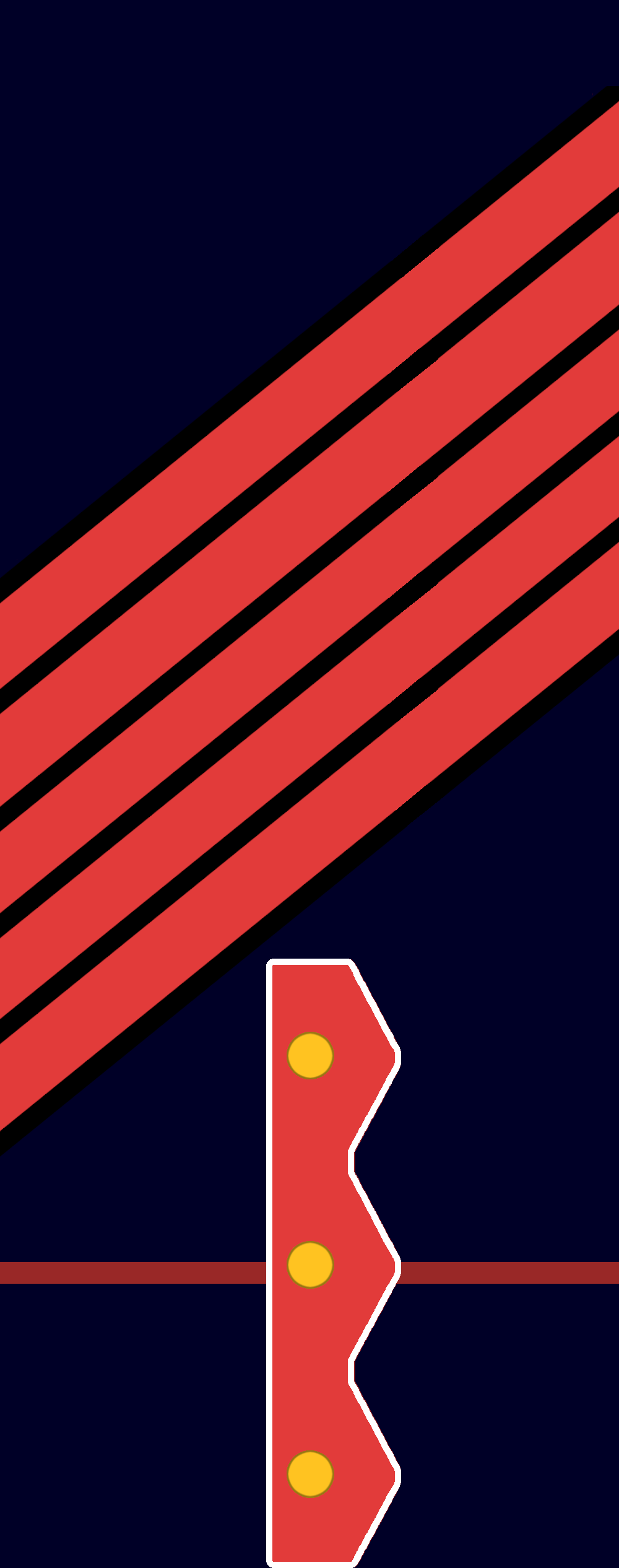
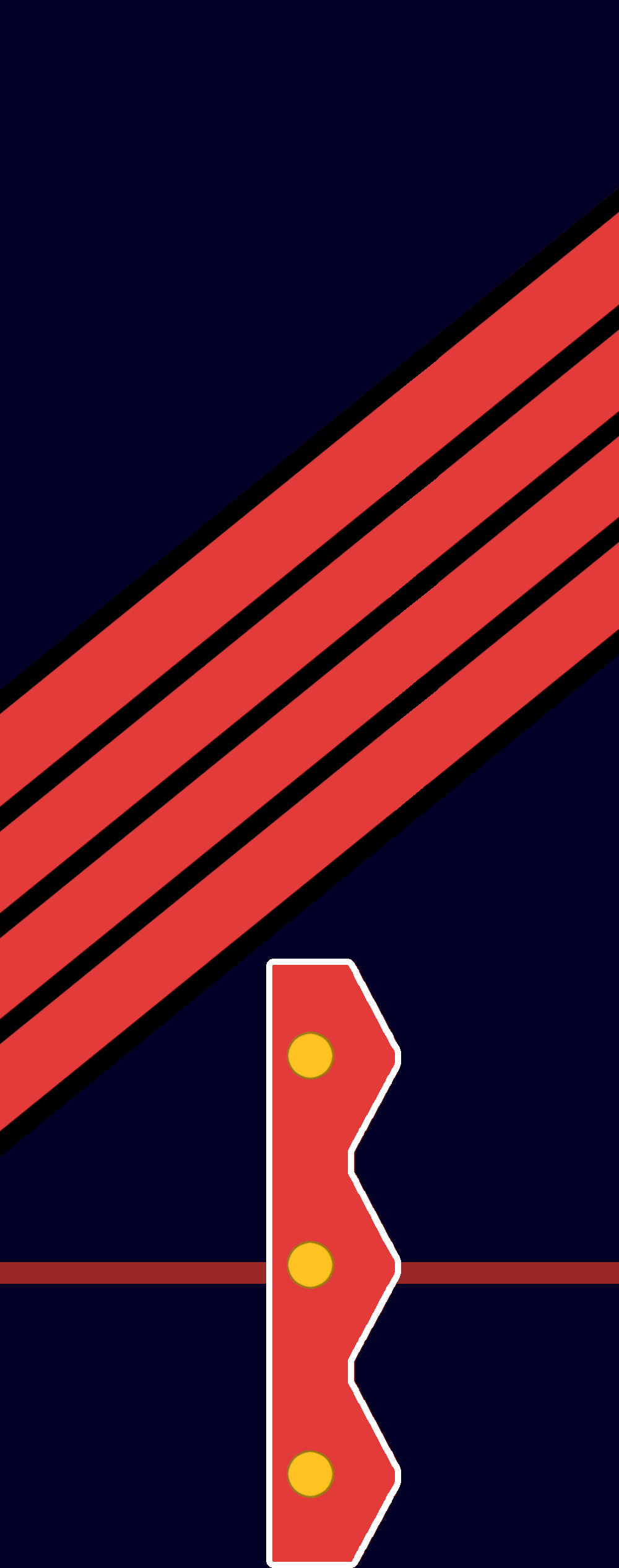
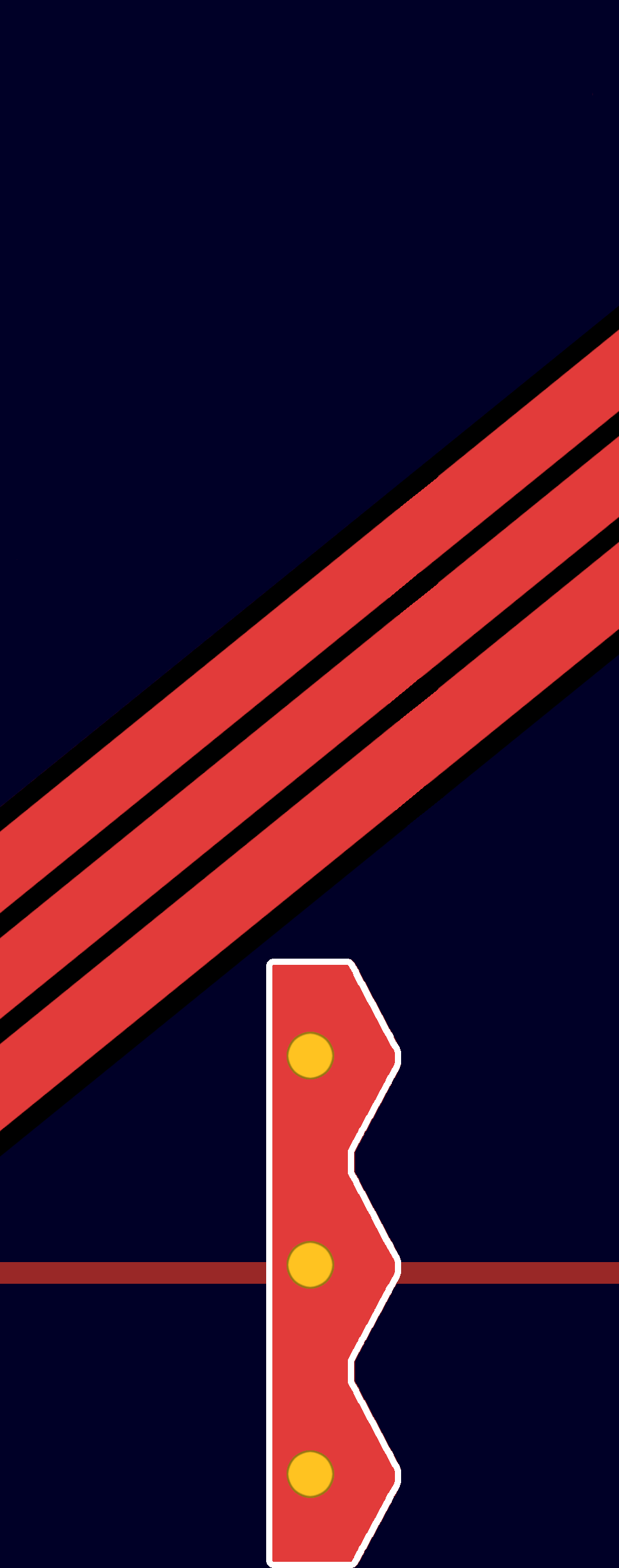
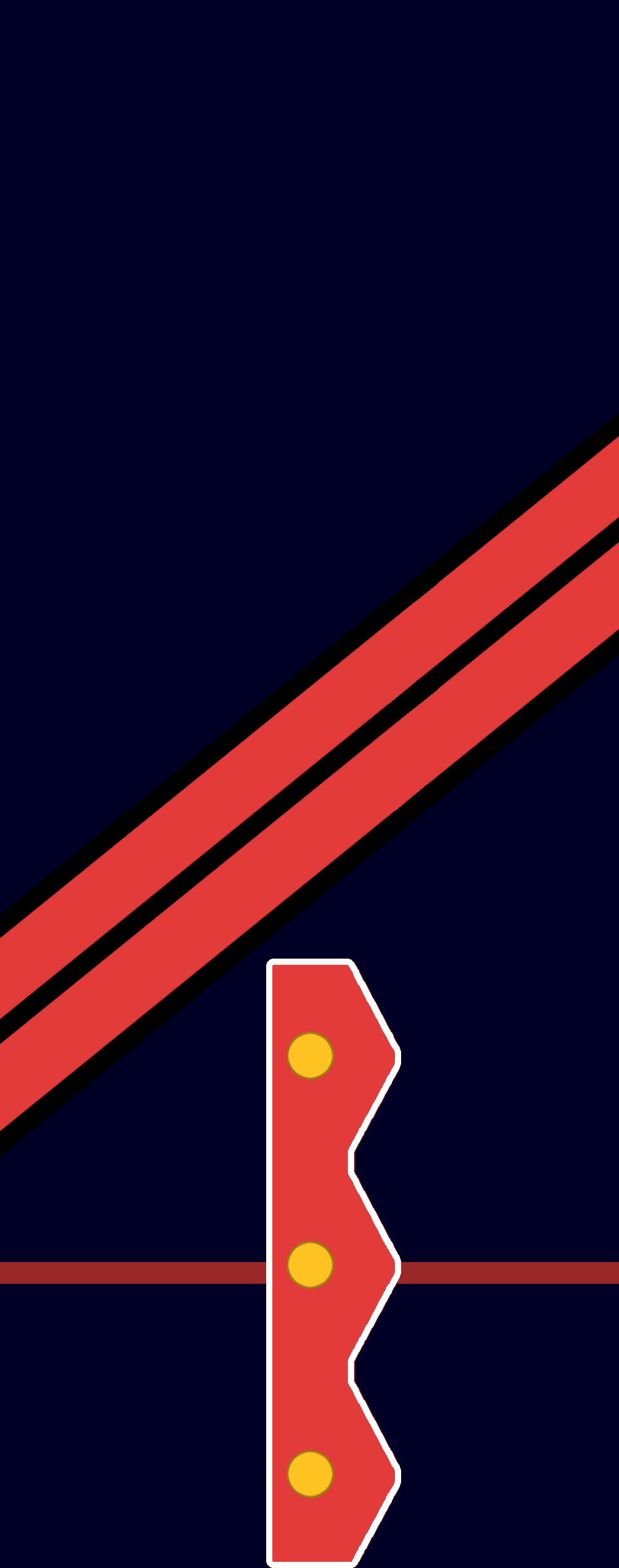
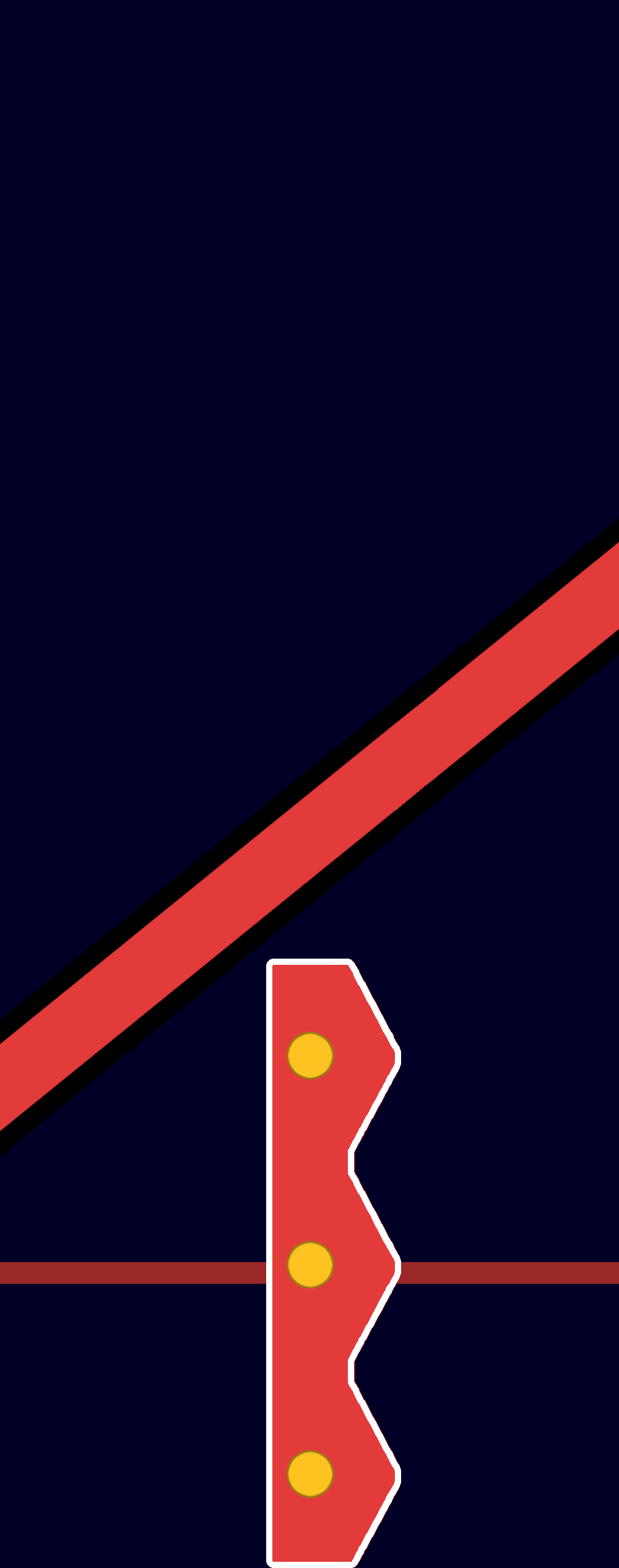
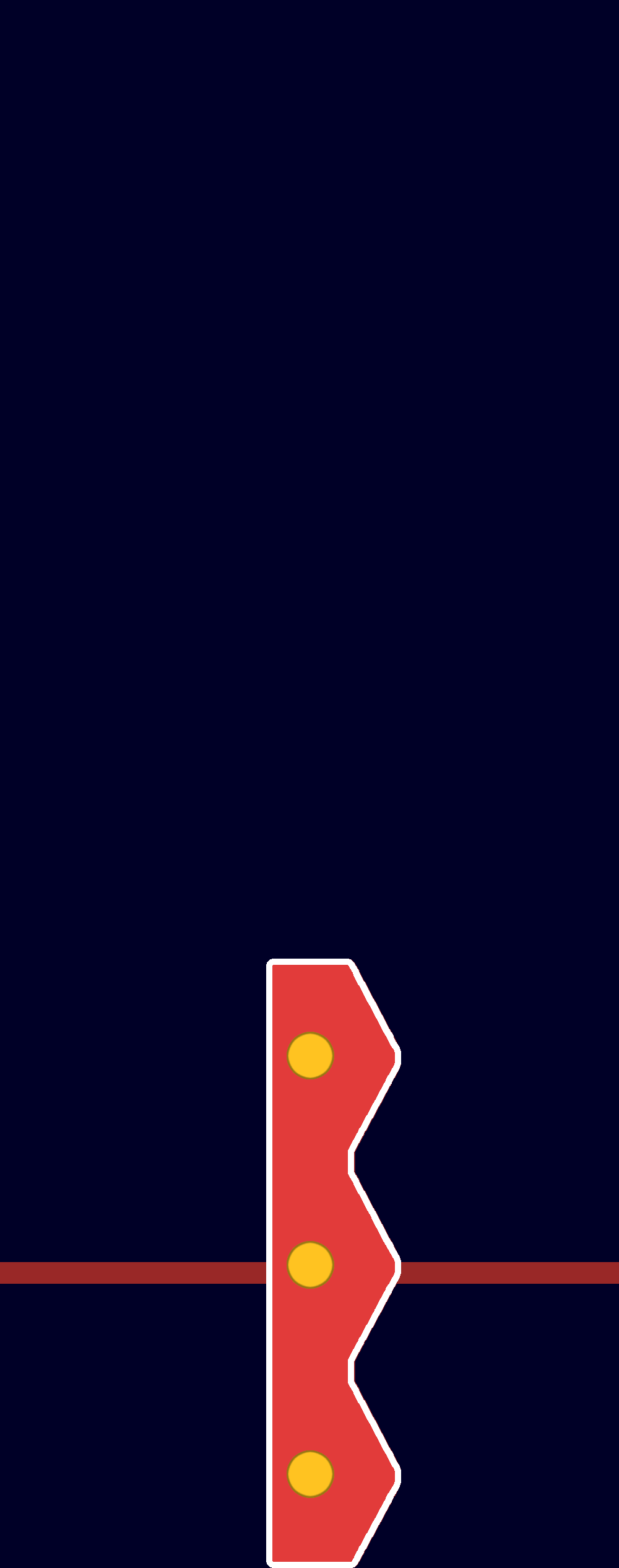
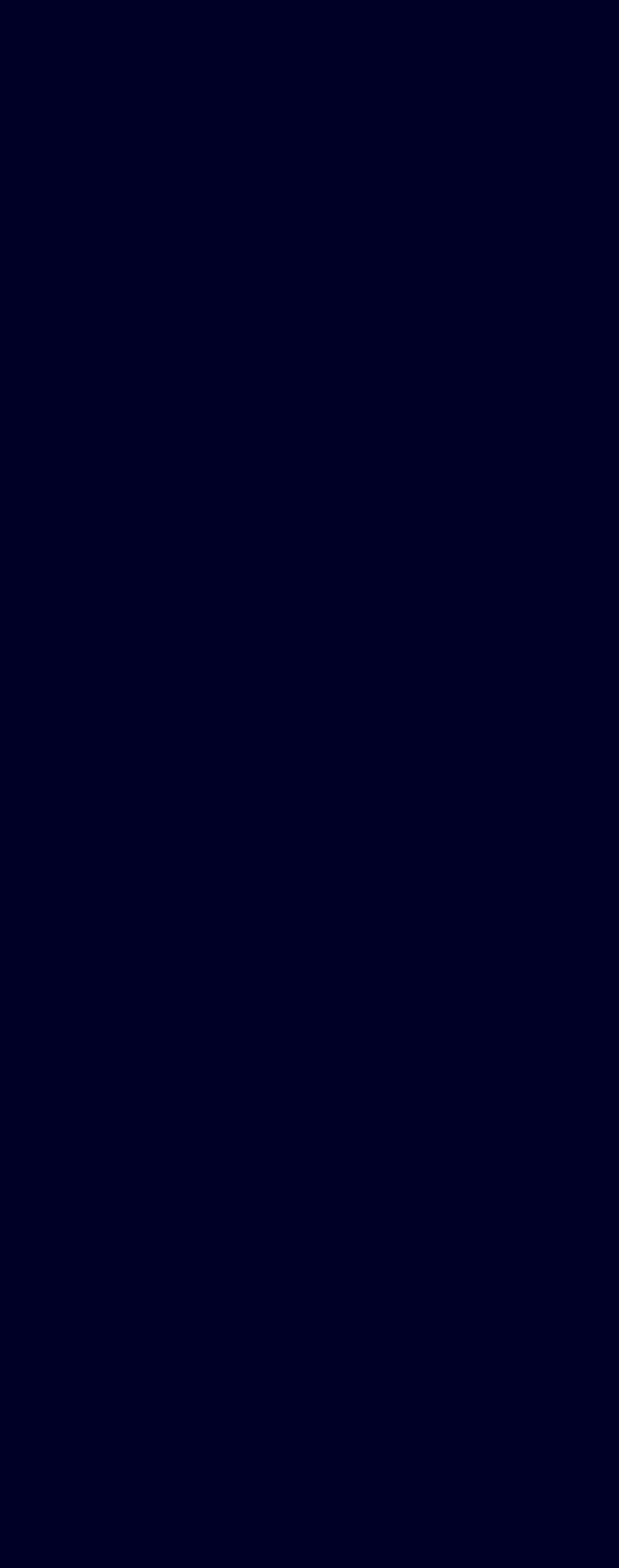
Rank group	Senior NCOs			Junior NCOs		Enlisted
Sleeve rank insignia
Sleeve rank insignia	Primeiro-sargento	Segundo-sargento	Furriel	Cabo	Anspeçada	Soldado

== National Guard ==
=== 1831 ===
==== Officers ====
Rank group	General / flag officers	Senior officers			Junior officers
Collar Rank insignia
Name	Comandante Superior	Coronel Chefe de Legião	Tenente-coronel	Sargento-Major	Capitão	Tenente	Alferes

==== Praças ====
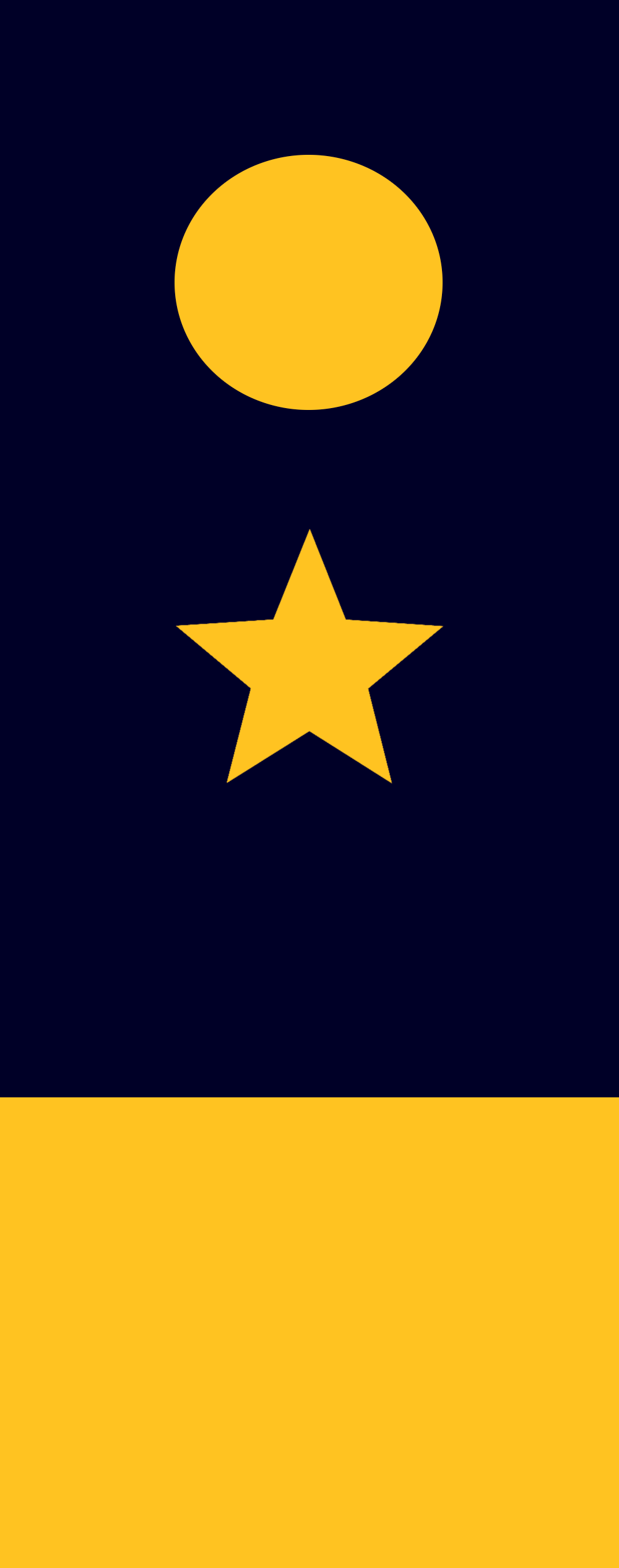
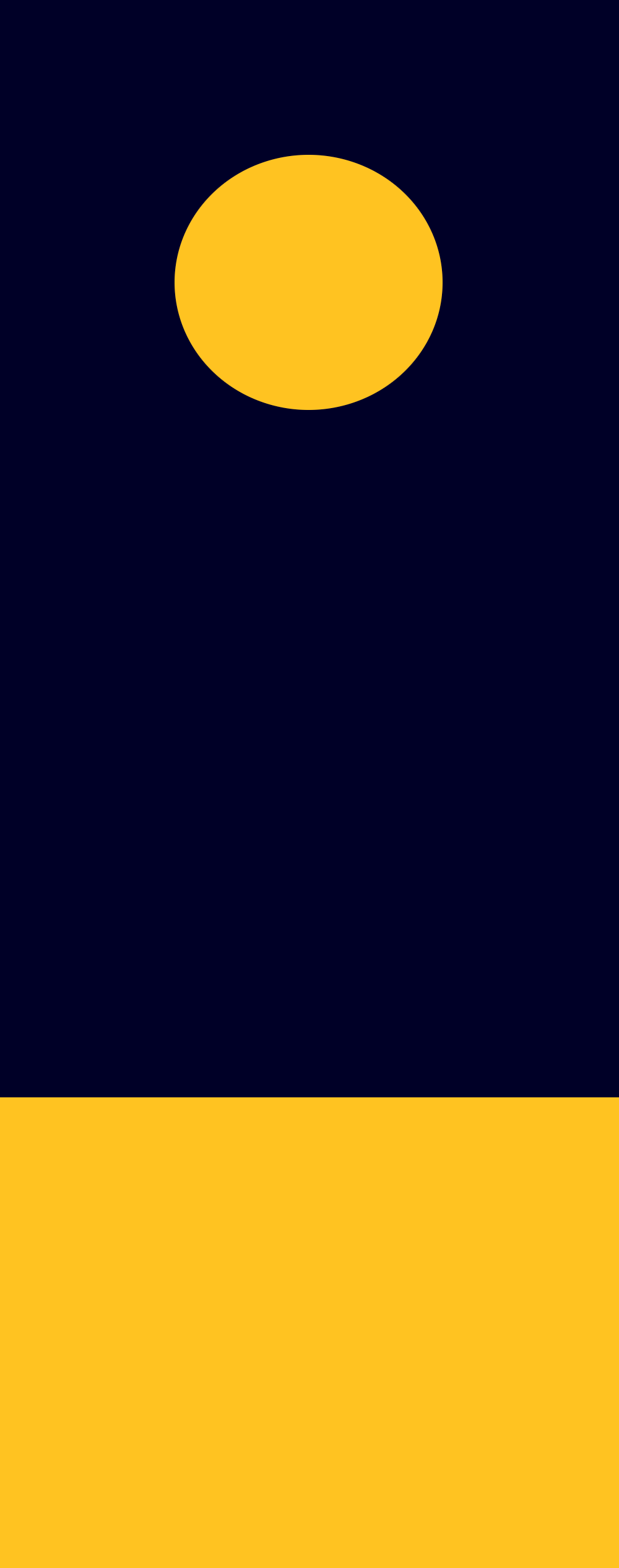
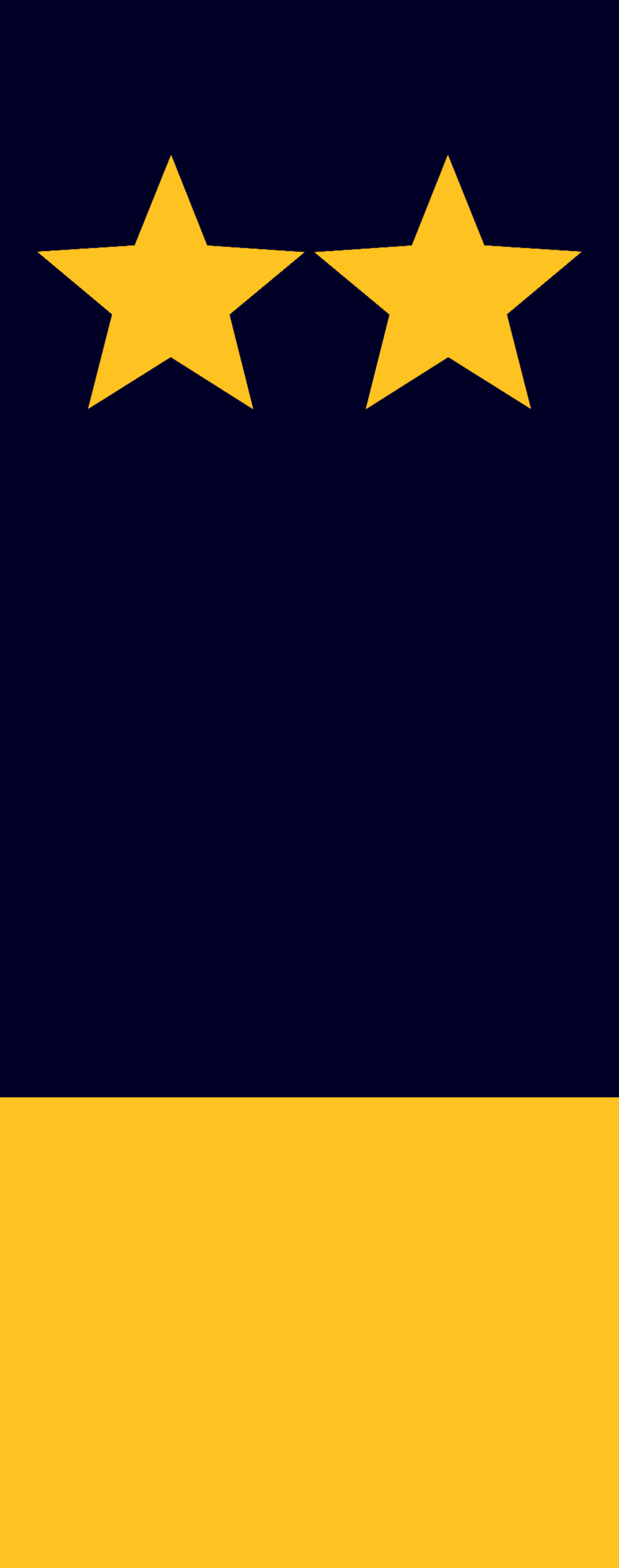
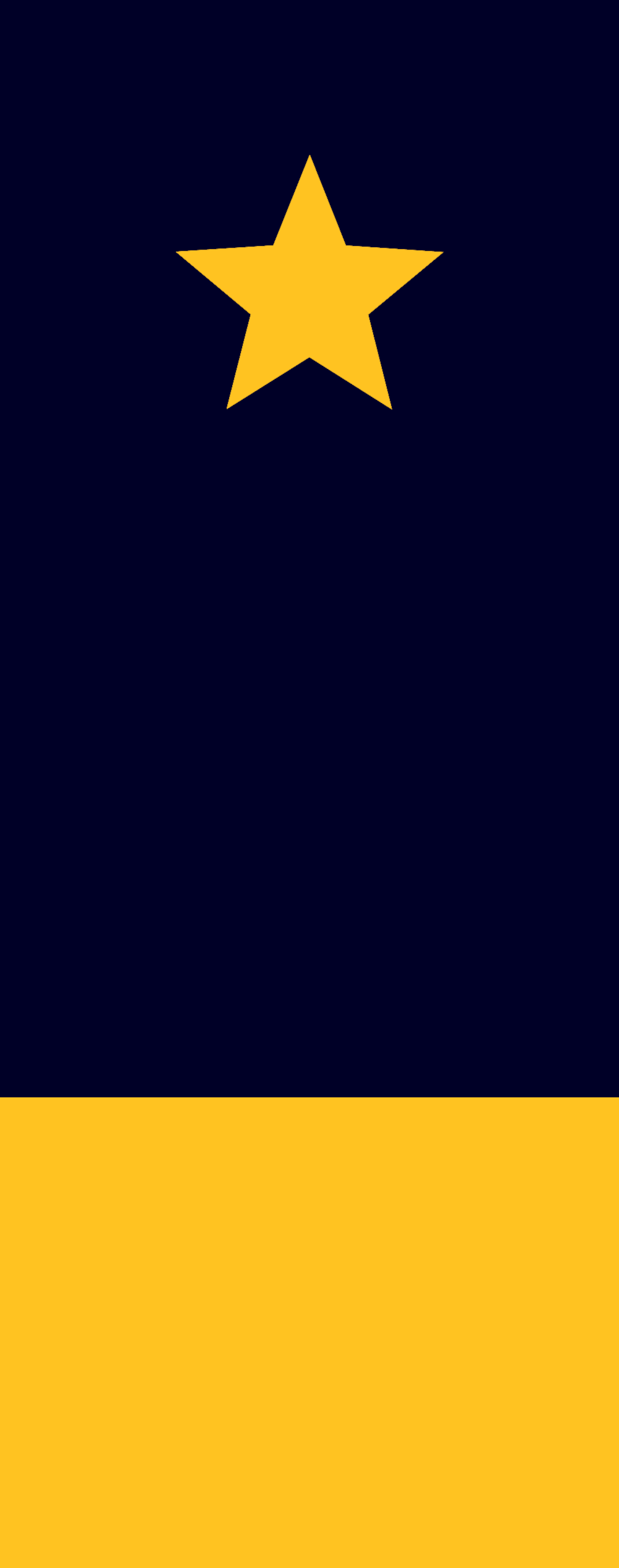
Rank group	Senior NCOs			Junior NCOs	Enlisted
Collar Rank insignia
Sleeve rank insignia
Names	Primeiro-sargento	Segundo-sargento	Furriel	Cabo

== Bibliography ==
- Barroso, Gustavo (1922). Uniformes Do Exército Brasileiro [Uniforms of the Brazilian Army] (in Brazilian Portuguese).
- Barroso, Gustavo (1938). "História Militar do Brasil" [Military History of Brazil] (in Brazilian Portuguese).
- Fernandes, Antonio Manoel (1849). Indice chronologico, explicativo e remissivo da legislação brasileira desde 1822 até 1848 : precedido cada anno, além do reinado, que a elle presidio, dos nomes dos ministros, que dirigirão as respectivas repartições, e cada legislatura dos nomes dos senadores, e deputados, que nella tomarão parte [Chronological, explanatory and remissive index of Brazilian legislation from 1822 to 1848: preceded each year, in addition to the reign, which he presided over, the names of ministers, who will direct the respective departments, and each legislature of the names of senators, and deputies, who will take part in it] (in Brazilian Portuguese). Vol. 2. p. 65.
