= Machaín-Irigoyen Treaty =

1876 treaty between Paraguay and Argentina

Machaín–Irigoyen Treaty
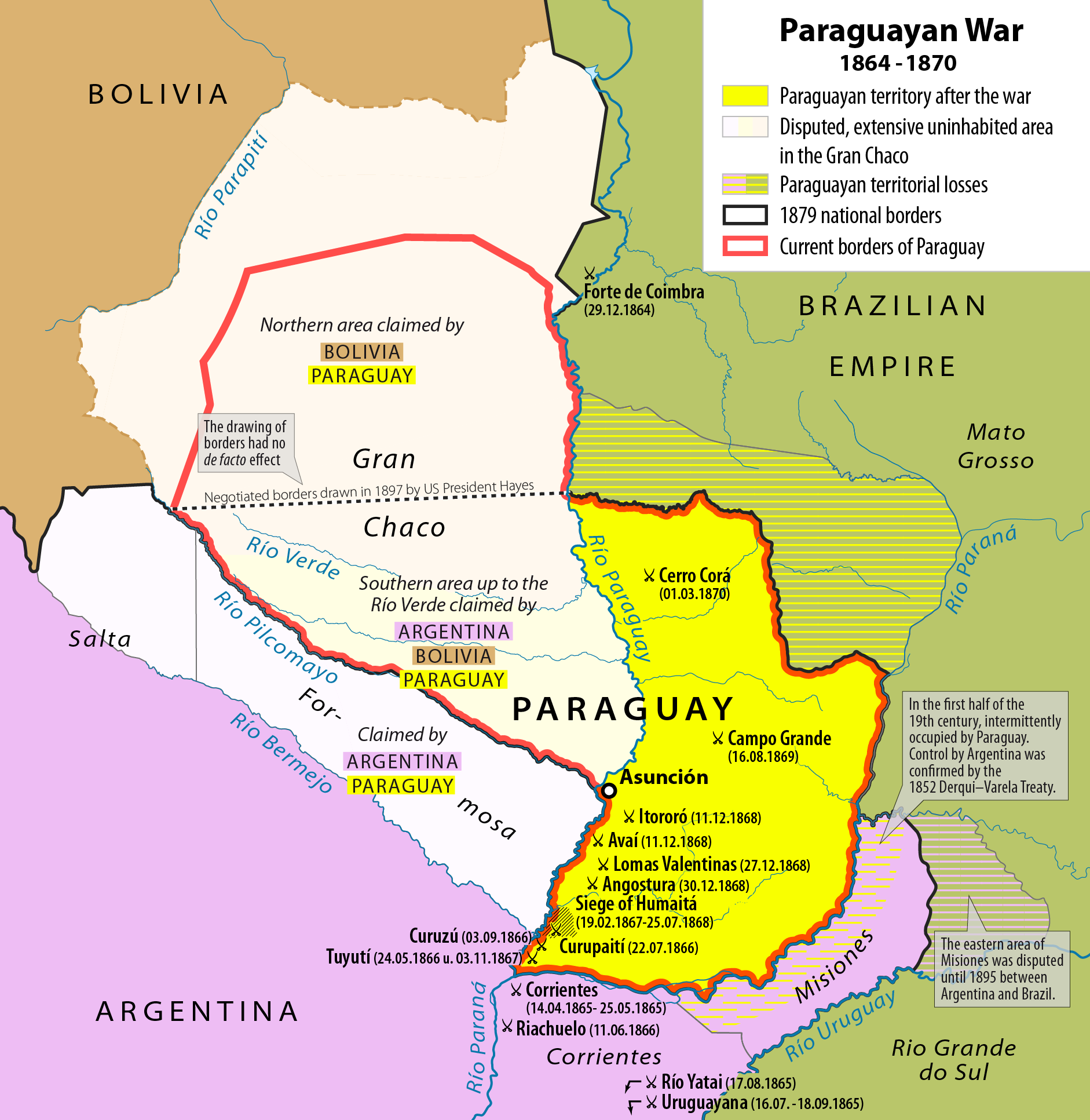
- Type: Bilateral treaty
- Signed: 3 February 1876
- Location: Buenos Aires, Argentina
- Signatories: Paraguay; Argentina
- Languages: Spanish

The Machain–Irigoyen Treaty was a border treaty signed in Buenos Aires on 3 February 1876 between Paraguay and Argentina. Concluded in the aftermath of the Paraguayan War, it was signed by Facundo Machaín and Bernardo de Irigoyen.

It satisfied most of Argentina’s territorial claims and led to the complete withdrawal of Allied occupational troops from Paraguay by the mid-summer of 1876. Argentina gained the disputed Misiones Province and all the lands south of the Pilcomayo River, which forms Formosa Province. Argentina gave up its claims on Villa Occidental. Only the issue of the Chaco Boreal (Northern Chaco) was left unresolved.

Brazil had signed the separate Loizaga–Cotegipe Treaty with Paraguay in 1872 and sided with Paraguay in its negotiations with Argentina. Paraguay, with Brazilian support, refused to give up Chaco territory, and both sides agreed to international arbitration by American president Rutherford B. Hayes, who, on November 12, 1878, decided in favor of Paraguay. In his honor, the Presidente Hayes Department was created.

That decision created a scandal in Bolivia, which claimed much of the disputed Chaco region. The unresolved conflict would later lead to the 1932-1935 Chaco War.
