= Loizaga–Cotegipe Treaty =

1872 treaty between Paraguay and Brazil

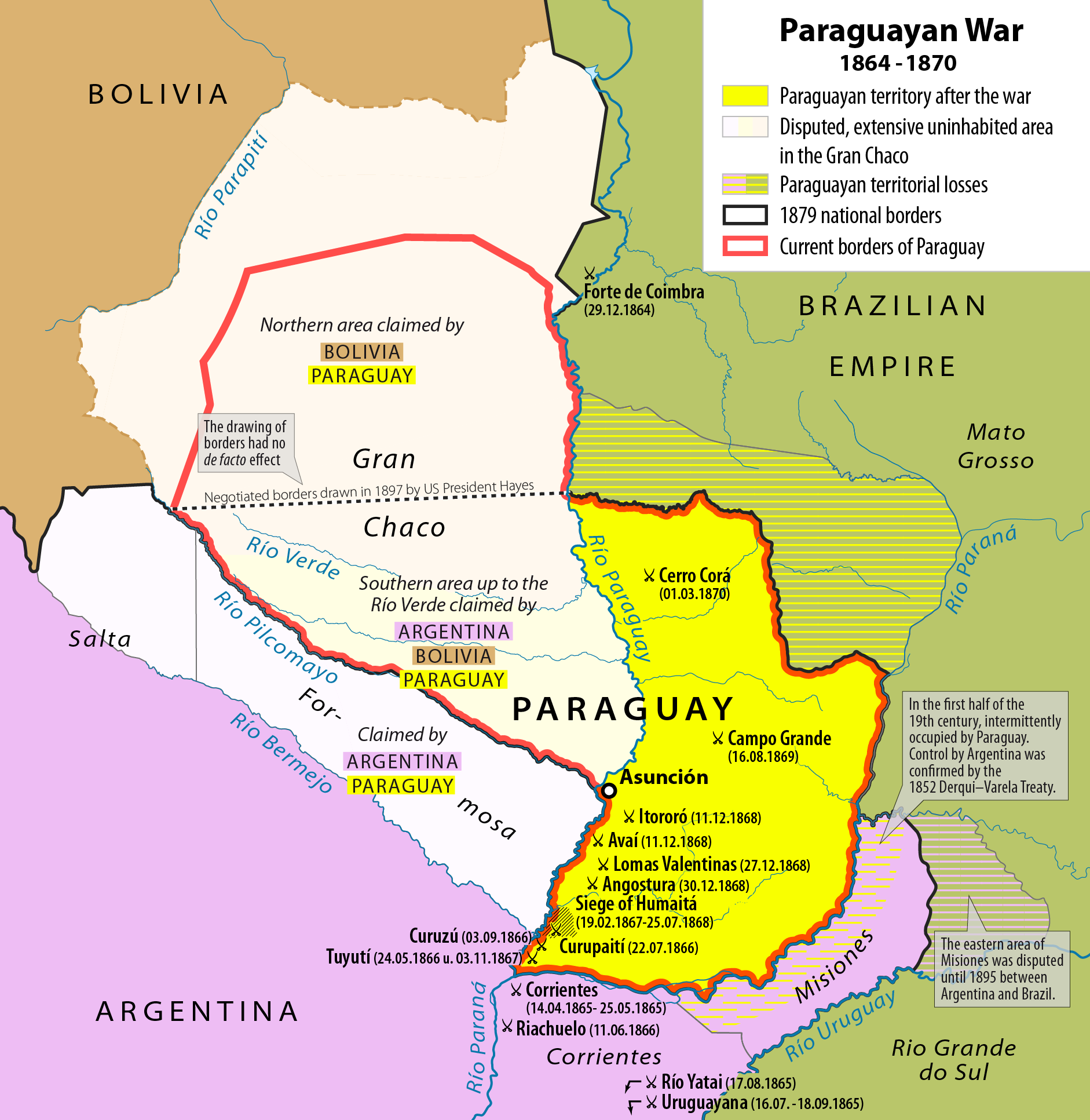
- Type: Bilateral treaty
- Signed: 9 January 1872
- Location: Asunción, Paraguay
- Signatories: Paraguay; Empire of Brazil
- Languages: Spanish and Portuguese

The Loizaga–Cotegipe Treaty was a treaty of peace and borders signed in Asunción on 9 January 1872 between Paraguay and Brazil. It established the boundaries between the two countries after Paraguay's defeat in the Paraguayan War.

The treaty was signed by Carlos Loizaga and João Maurício Vanderlei, Baron of Cotegipe. The treaty gave Brazil all the territories north of the Apa River that it had claimed before the war, a total of 62,325 square kilometres (24,064 sq mi). Ambiguity over the exact borderline between the two nations later led to dispute over the ownership of Guaíra Falls.

Despite its obligations under the Treaty of the Triple Alliance towards Argentina and Uruguay, Brazil concluded the treaty with Paraguay separately. In response, Argentina occupied Villa Occidental, to enforce its claims in Gran Chaco.
