= Military history of Brazil =

The military history of Brazil comprises centuries of armed actions in the territory encompassing modern Brazil, and the role of the Brazilian Armed Forces in conflicts and peacekeeping worldwide. For several hundreds of years, the area was the site of intertribal wars of indigenous peoples. Beginning in the 16th century, the arrival of Portuguese explorers led to conflicts with the indigenous peoples; a notable example being the revolt of the Tamoio Confederation. Sporadic revolts of African slaves also marked the colonial period, with a notable rebellion led by Zumbi dos Palmares. Conflicts were fought with other European nations as well – two notable examples being the France Antarctique affair, and a conflict with the Netherlands in the early 17th century over control of much of Northeastern Brazil. Although Portugal retained its possessions during conflicts with other nations, it lost control of the colony after the Brazilian war of Independence, which led to the establishment of the Empire of Brazil.

Brazil's history after independence is marked by early territorial wars against its neighboring countries which have greatly affected the formation of current political boundaries. For example, the Cisplatine War, fought over the present day territory of Uruguay established that nation's independence. Brazil was also affected in its early years by internal – and ultimately, unsuccessful – revolts in the Northern provinces. An armed conflict with Paraguay led to the establishment of Brazil's current border with that nation after a decisive victory. Internal conflicts between the executive government and the power of wealthy landowners finally led to the abolishment of the Brazilian Empire, and the rise of the current republican government.

Modern activity includes participation in both World Wars along with internal struggles due to military rule, and participation in right wing military operations, such as Operation Condor. Recent developments include participation in peacekeeping efforts after the 2004 Haiti rebellion.

== European colonization ==
=== Indigenous rebellions ===
The Tamoyo Confederation (Confederação dos Tamoios in Portuguese) was a military alliance of aboriginal chieftains of the sea coast ranging from what is today Santos to Rio de Janeiro, which occurred from 1554 to 1567.

The main reason for this rather unusual alliance between separate tribes was to react against slavery and wholesale murder and destruction wrought by the early Portuguese discoverers and colonisers of Brazil onto the Tupinambá people. In the Tupi language, "Tamuya" means "elder" or "grandfather". Cunhambebe was elected chief of the Confederation by his counterparts, and together with chiefs Pindobuçú, Koakira, Araraí and Aimberê, declared war on the Portuguese.

=== Slave rebellions ===
Slave rebellions were frequent until the practice of slavery was abolished in 1888. The most famous of the revolts was led by Zumbi dos Palmares. The state he established, named the Quilombo dos Palmares, was a self-sustaining republic of Maroons escaped from the Portuguese settlements in Brazil, and was "a region perhaps the size of Portugal in the hinterland of Pernambuco". At its height, Palmares had a population of over 30,000.

Forced to defend against repeated attacks by Portuguese colonial power, the warriors of Palmares were expert in capoeira, a martial arts form developed in Brazil by African slaves in the 16th century.

An African known only as Zumbi was born free in Palmares in 1655, but was captured by the Portuguese and given to a missionary, Father António Melo when he was approximately 6 years old. Baptized Francisco, Zumbi was taught the sacraments, learned Portuguese and Latin, and helped with daily mass. Despite attempts to "civilize" him, Zumbi escaped in 1670 and, at the age of 15, returned to his birthplace. Zumbi became known for his physical prowess and cunning in battle and was a respected military strategist by the time he was in his early twenties.

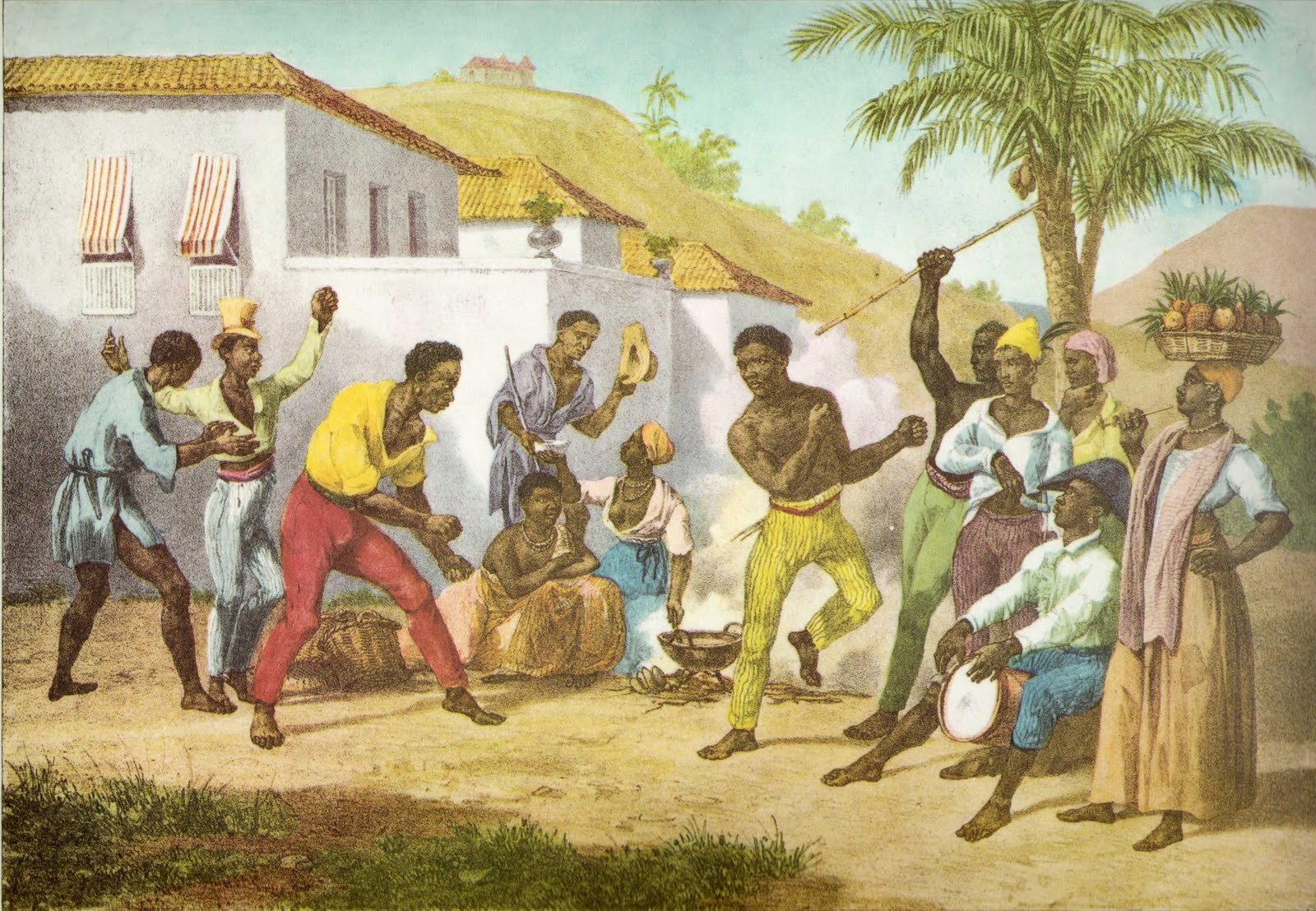
Capoeira or the Dance of War by Johann Moritz Rugendas, 1835

By 1678, the governor of the captaincy of Pernambuco, Pedro Almeida, weary of the longstanding conflict with Palmares, approached its leader Ganga Zumba with an olive branch. Almeida offered freedom for all runaway slaves if Palmares would submit to Portuguese authority, a proposal which Ganga Zumba favored. But Zumbi was distrustful of the Portuguese. Further, he refused to accept freedom for the people of Palmares while other Africans remained enslaved. He rejected Almeida's overture and challenged Ganga Zumba's leadership. Vowing to continue the resistance to Portuguese oppression, Zumbi became the new leader of Palmares.

Fifteen years after Zumbi assumed leadership of Palmares, Portuguese military commanders Domingos Jorge Velho and Vieira de Mello mounted an artillery assault on the quilombo. February 6, 1694, after 67 years of ceaseless conflict with the cafuzos, or Maroons, of Palmares, the Portuguese succeeded in destroying Cerca do Macaco, the republic's central settlement. Palmares' warriors were no match for the Portuguese artillery; the republic fell, and Zumbi was wounded. Though he survived and managed to elude the Portuguese, he was betrayed, captured almost two years later and beheaded on the spot November 20, 1695. The Portuguese transported Zumbi's head to Recife, where it was displayed in the central praça as proof that, contrary to popular legend among African slaves, Zumbi was not immortal. It was also done as a warning of what would happen to others if they tried to be as brave as him. Remnants of the old quilombos continued to reside in the region for another hundred years.

== Empire of Brazil ==
The early history of Brazil was marked by sporadic revolts in the country.

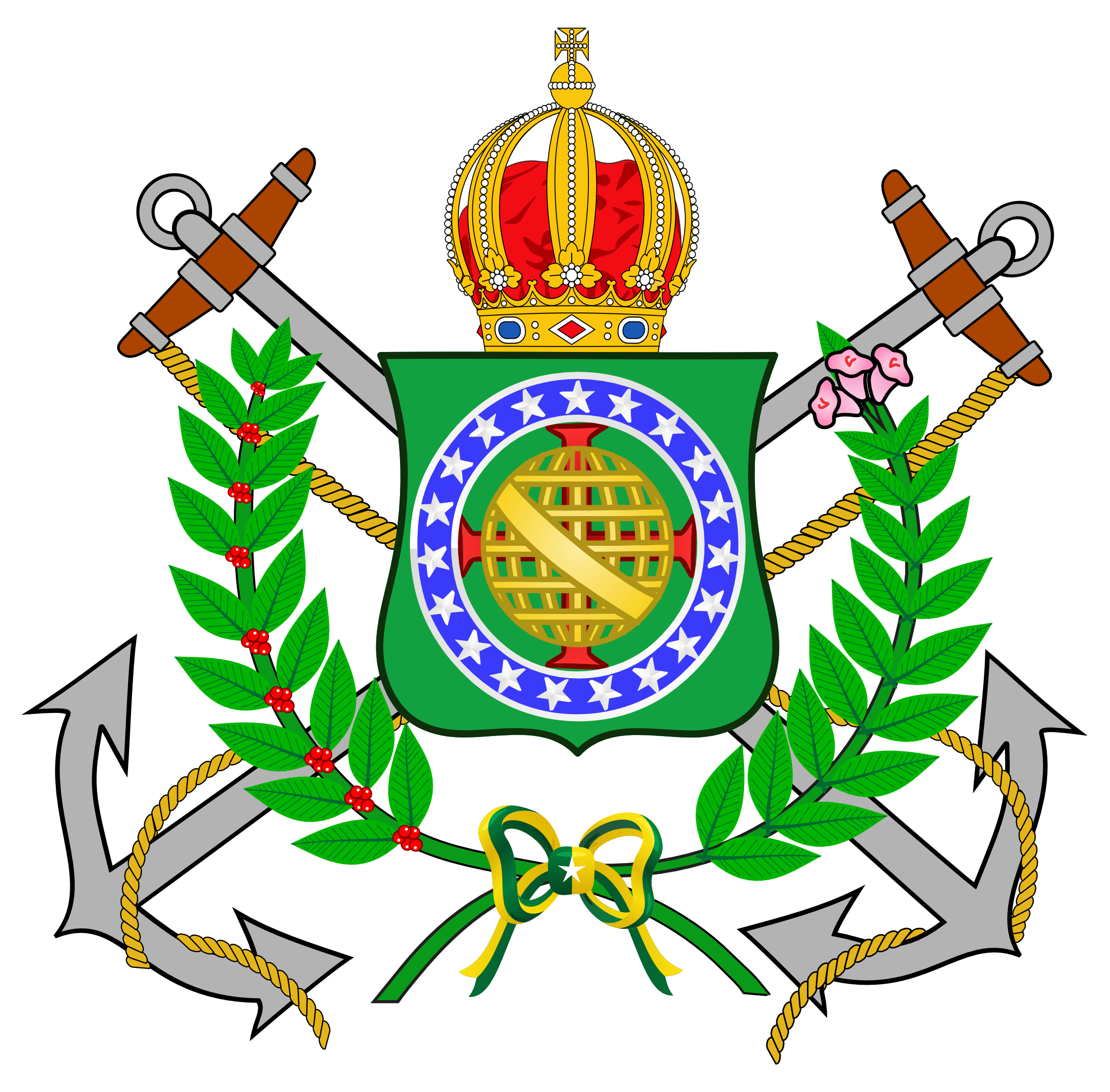
Imperial navy.

=== War of Independence ===
The Brazilian struggle for independence from Portugal began in early 19th century. In 1820 the Liberal revolution started which forced king John VI to go back to Portugal.

=== Paraguayan War ===
In 1864, the Paraguayan War started mostly due to the expansionist desires of Paraguayan president, Francisco Solano López. The start of the war has also been widely attributed to causes as varied as the after-effects of colonialism in Latin America, the struggle for physical power over the strategic River Plate region, Brazilian and Argentinian meddling in internal Uruguayan politics.

Since Brazil and Argentina had become independent, the fight between the governments of Buenos Aires and of Rio de Janeiro for hegemony in the River Plate basin profoundly marked the diplomatic and political relations between the countries of the region. Brazil almost entered into war with Argentina twice.

The government of Buenos Aires intended to reconstruct the territory of the old Viceroyalty of the River Plate, enclosing Paraguay and Uruguay. It carried out diverse attempts to do so during the first half of the 19th century, without success — many times due to Brazilian intervention. Fearing excessive Argentine control, Brazil favored a balance of power in the region, helping Paraguay and Uruguay retain their sovereignty.

Brazil, under the rule of the Portuguese, was the first country to recognize the independence of Paraguay in 1811. While Argentina was ruled by Juan Manuel Rosas (1829–1852), a common enemy of both Brazil and Paraguay, Brazil contributed to the improvement of the fortifications and development of the Paraguayan army, sending officials and technical help to Asunción. As no roads linked the province of Mato Grosso to Rio de Janeiro, Brazilian ships needed to travel through Paraguayan territory, going up the Río Paraguay to arrive at Cuiabá. Many times, however, Brazil had difficulty obtaining permission to sail from the government in Asunción.

Brazil carried out three political and military interventions in Uruguay – in 1851, against Manuel Oribe to fight Argentine influence in the country; in 1855, at the request of the Uruguayan government and Venancio Flores, leader of the Colorados, who were traditionally supported by the Brazilian empire; and in 1864, against Atanásio Aguirre. This last intervention would lead to the outbreak of the Paraguayan War.

In April 1864, Brazil sent a diplomatic mission to Uruguay led by José Antônio Saraiva to demand payment for the damages caused to gaucho farmers in border conflicts with Uruguayan farmers. The Uruguayan president Atanásio Aguirre, of the National Party, refused the Brazilian demands. Solano López offered himself as mediator, but was turned down by Brazil. López subsequently broke diplomatic relations with Brazil — in August 1864 — and declared that the occupation of Uruguay by Brazilian troops would be an attack on the equilibrium of the River Plate region.

On October 12, Brazilian troops invaded Uruguay. The followers of the Colorado Venancio Flores, who had the support of Argentina, united with the Brazilian troops and deposed Aguirre.

When attacked by Brazil, the Uruguayan Blancos asked for help from Solano López, but Paraguay did not directly come to their ally's aid. Instead, on November 12, 1864, the Paraguayan ship Tacuari captured the Brazilian ship Marquês of Olinda which had sailed up the Río Paraguay to the province of Mato Grosso. Paraguay declared war on Brazil on December 13 and on Argentina three months later, on March 18, 1865. Uruguay, already governed by Venancio Flores, aligned itself with Brazil and Argentina.

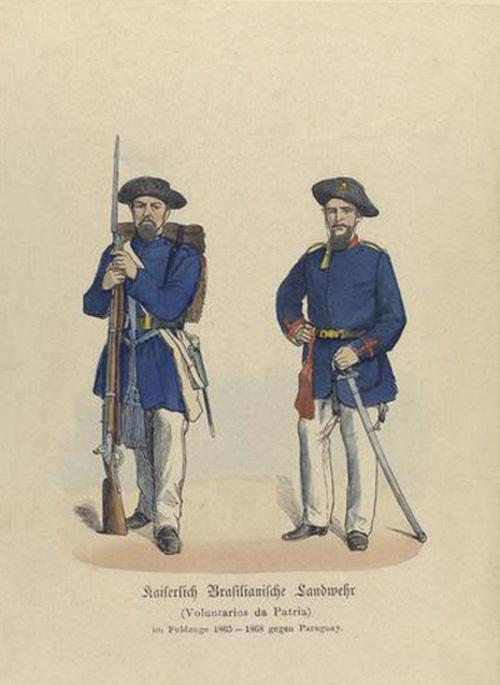
Soldiers of the Brazilian Volunteers for the Fatherland Corps

At the beginning of the war, the military force of the Triple Alliance was inferior to that of Paraguay, which included more than 60,000 well-trained soldiers – 38,000 of whom were immediately under arms – and a naval squadron of 23 vapores and five river-navigating ships, based around the gunboat the Tacuari. Its artillery included about 400 cannons.

The armies of Brazil, Argentina, and Uruguay were a fraction of the total size of the Paraguayan army. Argentina had approximately 8,500 regular troops and a squadron of four vapores and one goleta. Uruguay entered the war with fewer than 2,000 men and no navy. Many of Brazil's 16,000 troops were initially located in its southern garrisons. The Brazilian advantage, though, was in its navy: 42 ships with 239 cannons and about 4,000 well trained crew. A great part of the squadron already met in the River Plate basin, where it had acted, under the Marquis of Tamandaré, in the intervention against Aguirre.

Brazil, however, was unprepared to fight a war. Its army was unorganized. The troops used in the interventions in Uruguay were composed merely of the armed contingents of gaucho politicians and some of the staff of the National Guard. The Brazilian infantry who fought in the War of the Triple Alliance were not professional soldiers but volunteers, the so-called Voluntários da Pátria. Many were slaves sent by farmers. The cavalry was formed from the National Guard of Rio Grande Do Sul.

Brazil, Argentina and Uruguay would sign the Treaty of the Triple Alliance in Buenos Aires on May 1, 1865, allying the three River Plate countries against Paraguay. They named Bartolomé Mitre, president of Argentina, as supreme commander of the allied troops.

During the first phase of the war Paraguay took the initiative. The armies of López dictated the location of initial battles — invading Mato Grosso in the north in December 1864, Rio Grande do Sul in the south in the first months of 1865 and the Argentine province of Corrientes.

Two bodies of Paraguayan troops invaded Mato Grosso simultaneously. Due to the numerical superiority of the invaders the province was captured quickly.

Five thousand men, transported in ten ships and commanded by the colonel Vicente Barrios, went up the Río Paraguay and attacked the fort of Nova Coimbra. The garrison of 155 men resisted for three days under the command of the lieutenant-colonel Hermenegildo de Albuquerque Porto Carrero, later baron of Fort Coimbra. When the munitions were exhausted the defenders abandoned the fort and withdrew up the river on board the gunship Anhambaí in direction of Corumbá. After they occupied the empty fort the Paraguayans advanced north taking the cities of Albuquerque and Corumbá in January 1865.

The second Paraguayan column, which was led by Colonel Francisco Isidoro Resquín and included four thousand men, penetrated a region south of Mato Grosso, and sent a detachment to attack the military frontier of Dourados. The detachment, led by Major Martín Urbieta, encountered tough resistance on December 29, 1864, from Lieutenant Antonio João Ribeiro and his 16 men, who died without yielding. The Paraguayans continued to Nioaque and Miranda, defeating the troops of the colonel José Dias da Silva. Coxim was taken in April 1865.

The Paraguayan forces, despite their victories, did not continue to Cuiabá, the capital of the province. Augusto Leverger had fortified the camp of Melgaço to protect Cuiabá. The main objective was to distract the attention of the Brazilian government to the north as the war would lead to the south, closer to the River Plate estuary. The invasion of Mato Grosso was a diversionary maneuver.

The invasion of Corrientes and of Rio Grande do Sul was the second phase of the Paraguayan offensive. To raise the support of the Uruguayan Blancos, the Paraguayan forces had to travel through Argentine territory. In March 1865, López asked the Argentine government's permission for an army of 25,000 men (led by General Wenceslao Robles) to travel through the province of Corrientes. The president – Bartolomé Mitre, an ally of Brazil in the intervention in Uruguay – refused.

In the March 18, 1865, Paraguay declared war on Argentina. A Paraguayan squadron, coming down the Río Paraná, imprisoned Argentine ships in the port of Corrientes. Immediately, General Robles's troops took the city.

In invading Corrientes, López tried to obtain the support of the powerful Argentine caudillo Justo José de Urquiza, governor of the provinces of Corrientes and Entre Ríos, and the chief federalist hostile to Mitre and to the government of Buenos Aires. But Urquiza assumed an ambiguous attitude towards the Paraguayan troops—which would advance around 200 kilometers south before ultimately ending the offensive in failure.

Along with Robles's troops, a force of 10,000 men under the orders of the lieutenant-colonel Antonio de la Cruz Estigarriba crossed the Argentine border south of Encarnación, in May 1865, driving for Rio Grande do Sul. They traveled down Río Uruguay and took the town of São Borja on June 12. Uruguaiana, to the south, was taken on August 5 without any significant resistance. The Brazilian reaction was yet to come.

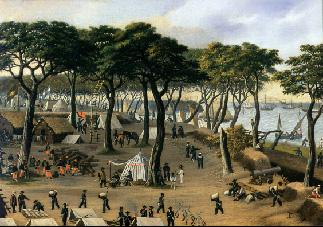
The Brazilian army in their camp at Curuzú, September 20, 1866, by Cándido López

Brazil sent an expedition to fight the invaders in Mato Grosso. A column of 2,780 men led by Colonel Manuel Pedro Drago left Uberaba in Minas Gerais in April 1865, and arrived at Coxim in December after a difficult march of more than two thousand kilometers through four provinces. But Paraguay had abandoned Coxim by December. Drago arrived at Miranda in September 1866 – and Paraguay had left once again. In January 1867, Colonel Carlos de Morais Camisão assumed command of the column, now only 1,680 men, and decided to invade Paraguayan territory, where he penetrated as far as Laguna. The expedition was forced to retreat by the Paraguayan cavalry.

Despite the efforts of Colonel Camisão's troops and the resistance in the region, which succeeded in liberating Corumbá in June 1867, Mato Grosso remained under the control of the Paraguayans. They finally withdrew in April 1868, moving their troops to the main theatre of operations, in the south of Paraguay.

Communications in the River Plate basin was solely by river; few roads existed. Whoever controlled the rivers would win the war, so the Paraguayan fortifications had been built on the edges of the lower end of Río Paraguay.

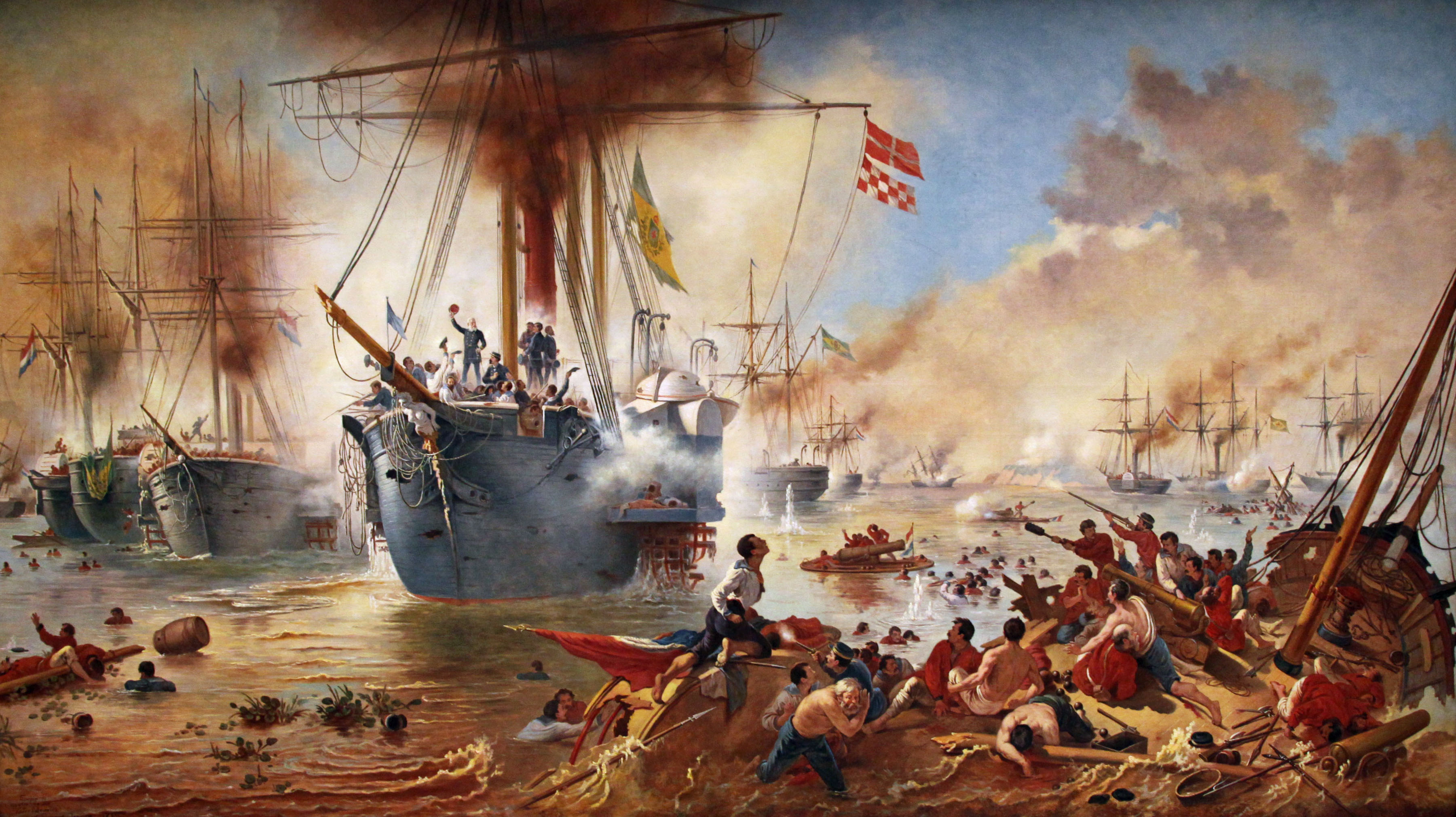
Artist's conception of the battle of Riachuelo, by Victor Meirelles

The naval battle of Riachuelo occurred on June 11, 1865. The Brazilian fleet commanded by Francisco Manoel Barroso da Silva won, destroying the powerful Paraguayan navy and preventing the Paraguayans from permanently occupying Argentine territory. The battle practically decided the outcome of the war in favour of the Triple Alliance, which controlled, from that point on, the rivers of the River Plate basin up to the entrance to Paraguay.

While López ordered the retreat of the forces that occupied Corrientes, the Paraguayan troops that invaded São Borja advanced, taking Itaqui and Uruguaiana. A separate division (3,200 men) that continued towards Uruguay, under the command of the major Pedro Duarte, was defeated by Flores in the bloody battle of Jataí on the banks of the Río Uruguay.

The allied troops united under the command of Mitre in the camp of Concórdia, in the Argentine province of Entre Ríos, with the field-marshal Manuel Luís Osório at the front of the Brazilian troops. Part of the troops, commanded by the lieutenant-general Manuel Marques de Sousa, baron of Porto Alegre, left to reinforce Uruguaiana. The Paraguayans yielded on September 18, 1865.

In the subsequent months the Paraguayans were driven out of the cities of Corrientes and San Cosme, the only Argentine territory still in Paraguayan possession. By the end of 1865, the Triple Alliance was on the offensive. Their armies numbered more than 50,000 men and were prepared to invade Paraguay.

The invasion of Paraguay followed the course of the Río Paraguay, from the Paso de la Patria. From April 1866 to July 1868, military operations concentrated in the confluence of the rivers Paraguay and Paraná, where the Paraguayans located their main fortifications. For more than two years, the advance of the invaders was blocked, despite initial Triple Alliance victories.

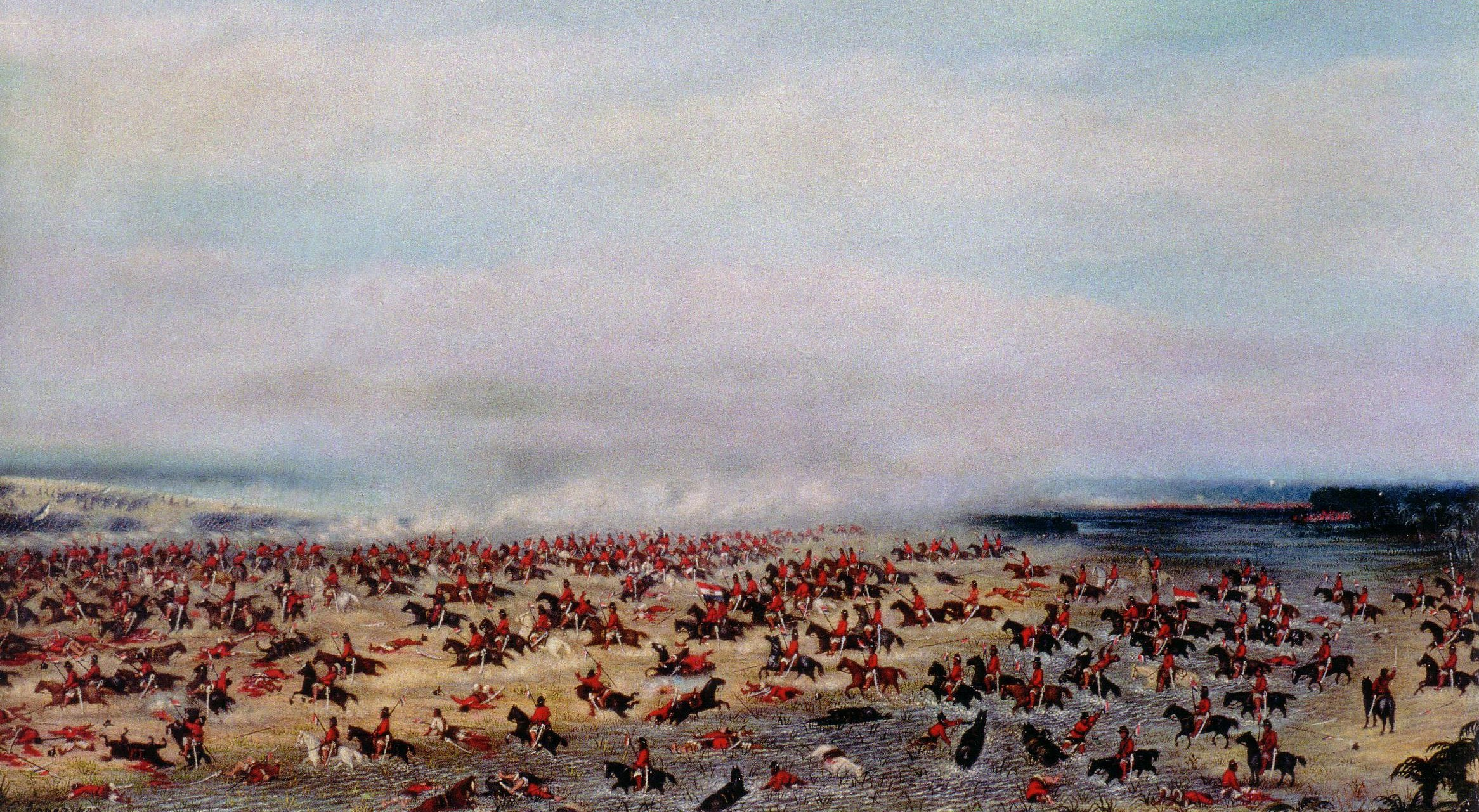
Artist's conception of the battle of Tuyutí (painted 1876–1885 by Cándido López)

The first stronghold taken was Itapiru. After the battles of the Paso de la Patria and of the Estero Bellaco, the allied forces camped on swamps of Tuyutí, where they were attacked. The first battle of Tuyutí, won by the allies on May 24, 1866, was the biggest pitched battle in the history of South America.

Due to health reasons, in July 1866, Osório passed the command of the First Corps of the Brazilian army to General Polidoro da Fonseca Quintanilha Jordão. At the same time, the Second Corps—10,000 men—arrived at the theater of operations, brought from Rio Grande Do Sul by the baron of Porto Alegre.

To open the way to Humaitá, the biggest Paraguayan stronghold, Mitre attacked the batteries of Curuzu and Curupaity. Curuzu was taken by surprise by the baron of Porto Alegre, but Curupaity resisted the 20,000 Argentines and Brazilians, led by Mitre and Porto Alegre, with support of the squadron of admiral Tamandaré. This failure (5,000 men were lost in a few hours) created a command crisis and stopped the advance of the allies.

During this phase of the war, many Brazilian servicemen distinguished themselves, amongst them, the heroes of Tuyutí: General José Luís Mena Barreto; Brigadier General Antônio de Sampaio, protector of the infantry weapons of the Brazilian Army; Lieutenant Colonel Emílio Luís Mallet, head of the artillery; and even Osório, head of the cavalry. In addition, Lieutenant Colonel João Carlos of Vilagrã Cabrita, head of weapons of engineering, died in Itapiru.

Assigned on October 10, 1866, to command the Brazilian forces, Marshal Luís Alves de Lima e Silva, Marquis and, later, Duke of Caxias, arrived in Paraguay in November, finding the Brazilian army practically paralyzed. The contingent of Argentines and Uruguayans, devastated by disease, were cut off from the rest of the allied army. Mitre and Flores returned to their respective countries due to questions of internal politics. Tamandaré was replaced in command by the Admiral Joaquim José Inácio, future Viscount of Inhaúma. Osório organized a 5,000-strong third Corps of the Brazilian army in Rio Grande do Sul. In Mitre's absence, Caxias assumed the general command and restructured the army.

Between November 1866 and July 1867, Caxias organized a health corps (to give aid to the endless number of injured soldiers and to fight the epidemic of cholera) and a system of supplying of the troops. In that period military operations were limited to skirmishes with the Paraguayans and to bombarding Curupaity. López took advantage of the disorganization of the enemy to reinforce his stronghold in Humaitá.

The march to flank the left wing of the Paraguayan fortifications constituted the basis of Caxias's tactics. Caxias wanted to bypass the Paraguayan strongholds, cut the connections between Asunción and Humaitá, and finally circle the Paraguayans. To this end, Caxias marched to Tuiu-Cuê.

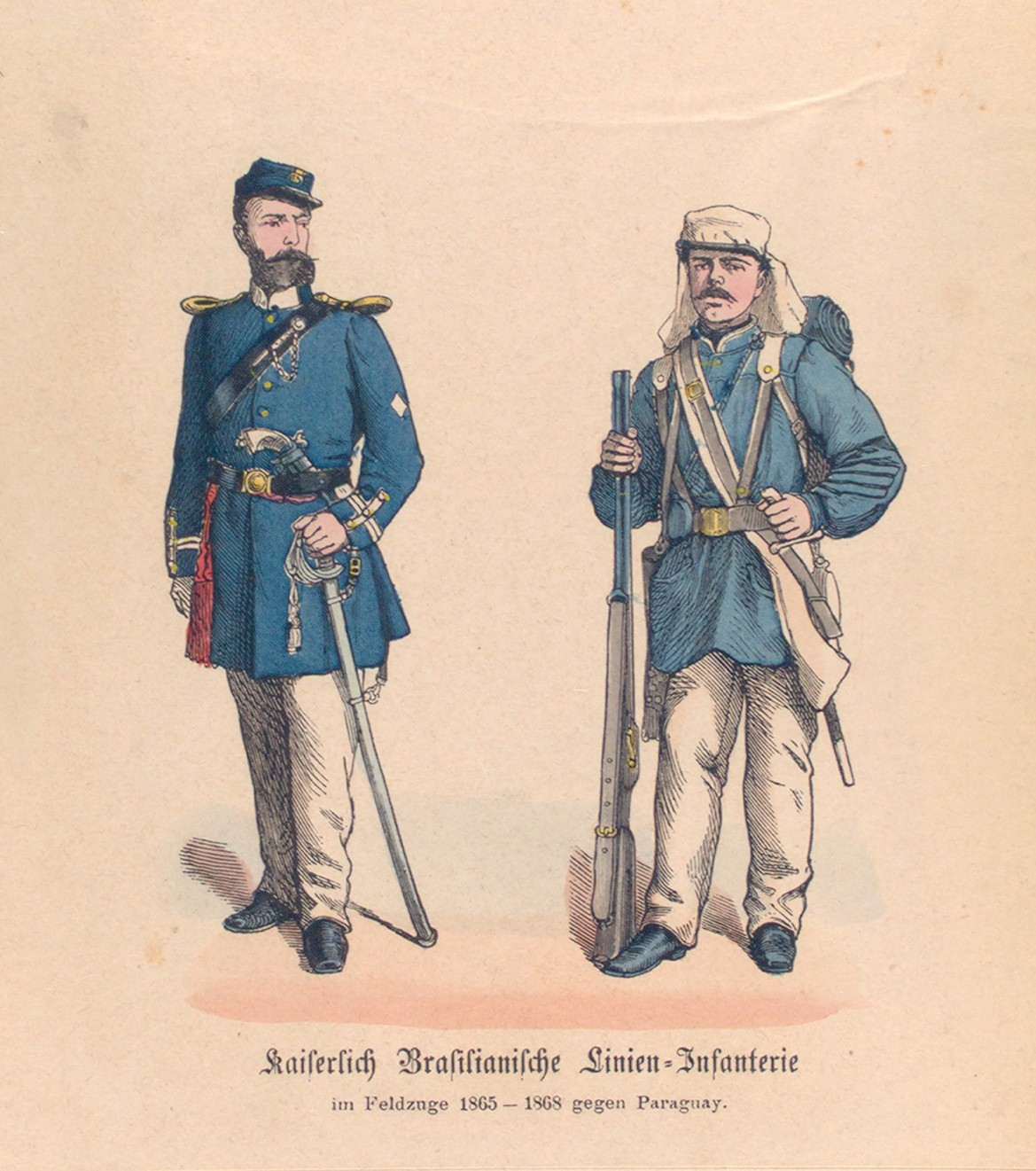
Brazilian officer and soldier

But Mitre, who had returned to the command in August 1867, insisted on attacking by the right wing, a strategy that had previously been disastrous in Curupaity. By his order, the Brazilian squadron forced its way past Curupaity but was forced to stop at Humaitá. New splits in the high command arose: Mitre wanted to continue, but the Brazilians instead captured São Solano, Pike and Tayi, isolating Humaitá from Asunción. In reaction, López attacked the rearguard of the allies in Tuiuti, but suffered new defeats.

With the removal of Mitre in January 1868, Caxias reassumed the supreme command and decided to bypass Curupaity and Humaitá, carried out with success by the squadron commanded by Captain Delfim Carlos de Carvalho, later Baron of Passagem. Humaitá fell on 25 July after a long siege.

En route to Asunción, Caxias's army went 200 kilometers to Palmas, stopping at the Piquissiri river. There López had concentrated 18,000 Paraguayans in a fortified line that exploited the terrain and supported the forts of Angostura and Itá-Ibaté. Resigned to frontal combat, Caxias ordered the so-called Piquissiri maneuver. While a squadron attacked Angostura, Caxias made the army cross on the right side of the river. He ordered the construction of a road in the swamps of the Chaco, upon which the troops advanced to the northeast. At Villeta, the army crossed the river again, between Asunción and Piquissiri, behind the fortified Paraguayan line. Instead of it advancing to the capital, already evacuated and bombarded, Caxias went south and attacked the Paraguayans from behind.

Caxias had obtained a series of victories in December 1868, when he went back south to take Piquissiri from the rear, capturing Itororó, Avaí, Lomas Valentinas and Angostura. On December 24 the three new commanders of the Triple Alliance (Caxias, the Argentine Juan Andrés Gelly y Obes, and the Uruguayan Enrique Castro) sent a note to Solano López asking for surrender. But López turned it down and fled for Cerro León.

Asunción was occupied on January 1, 1869, by commands of Colonel Hermes Ernesto da Fonseca, father of the future Marshal Hermes da Fonseca. On the fifth day, Caxias entered in the city with the rest of the army and 13 days later left his command.

The son-in-law of the emperor Dom Pedro II, Luís Filipe Gastão de Orléans, Count d'Eu, was nominated to direct the final phase of the military operations in Paraguay. He sought not just a total rout of Paraguay, but also the strengthening of the Brazilian Empire. In August 1869, the Triple Alliance installed a provisional government in Asunción headed by Paraguayan Cirilo Antonio Rivarola.

Solano López organized the resistance in the mountain range northeast of Asunción. At the head of 21,000 men, Count d'Eu led the campaign against the Paraguayan resistance, the Campaign of the Mountain Range, which lasted over a year. The most important battles were the battles of Piribebuy and of Acosta Ñu, in which more than 5,000 Paraguayans died.

Two detachments were sent in pursuit of Solano López, who was accompanied by 200 men in the forests in the north. On March 1, 1870, the troops of General José Antônio Correia da Câmara surprised the last Paraguayan camp in Cerro Corá, where Solano López was fatally injured by a spear as he tried to swim away down the Aquidabanigui stream. His last words were: "Muero por mi patria" (I die for my homeland). This marks the end of the war of the Triple Alliance.

Of the around 123,000 Brazilians that fought in the War of the Triple Alliance, the best estimates say that around 50,000 died.

The high rates of mortality, however, were not the result of the armed conflict in itself. Bad food and very bad hygiene caused most of the deaths. Among the Brazilians, two-thirds of the killed died in hospitals and during the march, before facing the enemy. In the beginning of the conflict, most of the Brazilian soldiers came from the north and northeast regions of the country; the changes from a hot to cold climate and the amount of food available to them were abrupt. Drinking the river water was sometimes fatal to entire battalions of Brazilians. Cholera was, perhaps, the main cause of death during the war.

A standstill began, and the Brazilian army, which was in complete control of the Paraguayan territory, remained in the country for six years after the final defeat of Paraguay in 1870, only leaving in 1876 in order to ensure the continued existence of Paraguay. During this time, the possibility of an armed conflict with Argentina for control over Paraguay became increasingly real, as Argentina wanted to seize the Chaco region, but was barred by the Brazilian Army.

No single overall peace treaty was signed. The post-war border between Paraguay and Argentina was resolved through long negotiations, finalized in a treaty that defined the frontier between the two countries signed on February 3, 1876, and which granted Argentina roughly a third of the area it had intended to incorporate originally. The only region about which no consensus was reached—the area between the Río Verde and the main branch of Río Pilcomayo—was arbitrated by US President Rutherford B. Hayes, who declared it Paraguayan. (The Paraguayan department Presidente Hayes was named after Hayes due to his arbitration decision.) Brazil signed a separate peace treaty with Paraguay on January 9, 1872, obtaining freedom of navigation on the Río Paraguay. Brazil received the borders it had claimed before the war. The treaty also stipulated a war debt to the imperial government of Brazil that was eventually pardoned in 1943 by Getúlio Vargas in reply to a similar Argentine initiative.

Brazil paid a high price for victory. The war was financed by the Bank of London, and by Baring Brothers and N M Rothschild & Sons. During the five years of war, Brazilian expenditure reached twice its receipts, causing a financial crisis.

In total, Argentina and Brazil annexed about 140,000 km^{2} (54,000 sq mi) of Paraguayan territory: Argentina took much of the Misiones region and part of the Chaco between the Bermejo and Pilcomayo rivers; Brazil enlarged its Mato Grosso province by claiming territories that had been disputed with Paraguay before the war. Both demanded a large indemnity (which was never paid) and occupied Paraguay until 1876. Meanwhile, the Colorados had gained political control of Uruguay, which they retained until 1958.

Slavery was undermined in Brazil as slaves were freed to serve in the war. The Brazilian army became a new and expressive force in national life. It transformed itself into a strong institution that, with the war, gained tradition and internal cohesion and would take a significant role in the later development of the history of the country.

The war took its biggest toll on the Brazilian emperor. The economic depression and the fortification of the army would later play a big role in the deposition of the emperor Dom Pedro II and the republican proclamation in 1889. General Deodoro da Fonseca would become the first Brazilian president.

== Modern Brazil ==
=== War of Canudos ===
The War of Canudos took place at northeastern Brazilian state of Bahia, from November, 1896, to October, 1897. The conflict had its origins in the settlement of Canudos, in the semi-arid backlands ("sertão" or "caatinga", in Portuguese) in the northeast tip of the state (then province) of Bahia.

After a number of unsuccessful attempts at military suppression, it came to a brutal end in October 1897, when a large Brazilian army force overran the village and killed most of the inhabitants.

Some authors, such as Euclides da Cunha (1902) estimated the number of deaths in the War of Canudos as being of ca. 31,000 (25,000 residents and 6,000 attackers) , but the real number was most probably lower (around 15,000, according to Levine, 1995).

=== Contestado War ===
The Contestado War (Portuguese: Guerra do Contestado), broadly speaking, was a land war between rebel civilians and the Brazilian state's federal police and military forces. It was fought in a region rich in wood and yerba mate that was contested by the States of Paraná, Santa Catarina and even Argentina, from October 1912 to August 1916. The war had its casus belli in the social conflicts in the region, the result of local disobediences, particularly regarding the regularization of land ownership on the part of the caboclos. The conflict was permeated by religious fanaticism expressed by the messianism and faith of the rebellious cablocos that they were engaged in a religious war; at the same time, it reflected the dissatisfaction of the population with its material situation.

=== World War I ===
Brazil entered World War I on 26 October 1917, as it had found itself increasingly threatened by Germany's declaration of unrestricted submarine warfare, culminating on 5 April 1918 with the sinking of the Brazilian ship Parana off the French coast.

Brazil's Effort in World War I occurred mainly at Atlantic campaign, with just a symbolic participation in the land warfare.

=== World War II ===
During the Second World War, the Brazilian Expeditionary Force, with about 25,300 soldiers, fought in the Allied campaigns in Italy. This participation with the Allies was a contradiction to the quasi-Fascist policies established by Getúlio Vargas' Estado Novo campaign. However, with the increasing trade with and diplomatic efforts by the United States and United Kingdom, in 1941 Brazil permitted the US to set up air bases in the states of Bahia, Pernambuco and Rio Grande do Norte, where the city of Natal received part of the US Navy's VP-52 patrol squadron. Also, the U.S. Task Force 3 established itself in Brazil, including a squad equipped to attack submarines and merchant vessels which tried to exchange goods with Japan. Besides being technically neutral, the increasing cooperation with the Allies led the Brazilian government to announce, on 28 January 1942 the decision to sever diplomatic relations with Germany, Japan and Italy. In July 1942, around thirteen Brazilian merchant vessels were sunk by German U-boats. About one hundred people died as a result of these attacks, most being crew members. At the time, Vargas decided not to take further measures against the Axis in an attempt to avoid an escalation of the conflict involving Brazil. However, in August 1942, one single German submarine, U-507, sank five Brazilian vessels in two days, causing more than six hundred deaths:

- On August 15, Baependy, travelling from Salvador to Recife was torpedoed at 19:12. 215 of its passengers and 55 of its crew were killed.
- At 21:03, the U-507 torpedoed Araraquara, also going from Salvador towards the north of the country. Of the 142 people on board, 131 were killed.
- Seven hours after the second attack, the U-507 attacked Aníbal Benévolo. All 83 passengers were killed. Of the crew of 71, only four survived.
- On August 17, near the city of Vitória, the Itagiba was sunk at 10:45, killing 36 people.
- Another Brazilian ship, Arará, travelling from Salvador to Santos, stopped to help the crippled Itagiba; but became the U-boat's fifth Brazilian victim; with 20 people killed.

The Brazilian population was restless. In the capital Rio de Janeiro, the people started to retaliate against German businesses, such as restaurants. The passive position of the Getúlio Vargas government was not enough to calm public opinion. Ultimately, the government found itself with no other choice but to declare war on the Axis on August 22, 1942.

The Brazilian 1st Division of the FEB was under the command of 15th Army Group of Field Marshal Harold Alexander (later succeeded by General Mark Clark), via the US Fifth Army of Lieutenant General Mark Clark (later succeeded by Lieutenant General Lucian Truscott) and the US IV Corps of Major General Willis D. Crittenberger. The overall organization of the Allied and German armies in Italy at the time can be found on the Gothic Line order of battle entry.

The Brazilian Air Force component was under the command of XXII Tactical Air Command, which was itself under the Mediterranean Allied Tactical Air Force.

The FEB headquarters functioned as an administrative headquarters and link to the Brazilian high command and War Minister General Eurico Gaspar Dutra in Rio de Janeiro.

General Mascarenhas de Moraes (later Marshal) was the commander of the FEB with General Zenóbio da Costa as commander of the division's three infantry regiments and General Cordeiro de Farias as commander of the divisional artillery.

The FEB was organized as a standard American infantry division, complete in all aspects, down to its logistical tail, including postal and banking services. It comprised the 1st, 6th and 11th Infantry Regiments of the Brazilian Army. Each regiment had three battalions, each composed of four companies.

Soon after Brazil declared war, it began the mobilization to create an expeditionary force to fight in Europe. This was a giant US-sponsored effort to convert an obsolete army into a modern fighting force. It took two years to properly train the 25,300 troops to join the Allied war effort.

In early July 1944, the first five thousand FEB soldiers left Brazil to Europe aboard the USNS General Mann, and disembarked in Naples, where they waited for the US Task Force 45, which they later joined. On late July, two more transports with Brazilian troops reached Italy, with two more following in November and February 1945.

The first weeks of the Brazilians in Italy were dedicated to acquiring and training with the new American uniforms, since the Brazilian ones would not suit the Italian climate. The troops moved to Tarquinia, 350 km north of Naples, where Clark's army was based. The FEB was in November 1944 integrated into General Crittenberger's U.S. IV Corps. The first missions of the Brazilians involved reconnaissance operations.

The Brazilian troops helped to fill the gap left by several divisions of the Fifth Army and French Expeditionary Corps that left Italy for Operation Dragoon, the invasion of southern France. On November 16, the FEB occupied Massarosa. Two days later it also occupied Camaiore and other small towns on the way north.

By then the FEB had already conquered Monte Prano, controlled the Serchio valley and the region of Castelnuovo, without any major casualties. The Brazilian soldiers, after that, were directed to the base of the Apennines, where they would spend the next months, facing the harsh winter and the resistance of the Gothic Line.

It was in that region that the Brazilian soldiers, together with men of many other nationalities, made one of their main contributions to the war: the Battle of Monte Castello. The combined forces of the FEB and the American 10th Mountain Division were assigned the task of clearing Monte Belvedere of Germans and minefields. The Brazilians suffered from ambushes, machine gun nests, and heavy barrages of mortar fire.

On late February, while the battle for Monte Castello was still taking place, elements of the FEB conquered the city of Castelnuovo Rangone and, on March 5, Montese. The German mass retreat had started. In just a few days, Parma and Bologna were taken. After that, the main concern of the Allied forces in Italy was pursuing the enemy. After capturing a large number of Germans in the Battle of Collecchio, the Brazilian forces were preparing to face fierce resistance at the Taro region from what was left of the retreating German army. The German troops were surrounded near Fornovo and forced to surrender. More than sixteen thousand men, including the entire 148th Infantry Division, elements of the 90th Light Infantry Division (Germany), several Italian units and more than a thousand vehicles, surrendered to the Brazilian Forces on April 28.

On May 2, the Brazilians reached Turin and met French troops at the border. Meanwhile, on the Alps, the FEB was on the heels of German forces still on the run. On that very day, the news that Hitler was dead put an end to the fighting in Italy, and all German troops surrendered to the Allies in the following hours.

Formed on 18 December 1943, the 1ºGAVCA (1st Fighter Group) was composed of volunteer Brazilian Air Force (Portuguese: Força Aérea Brasileira, or FAB) pilots. Its commanding officer was Ten.-Cel.-Av. (Lt. Col. Pilot) Nero Moura. The group had 350 men, including 43 pilots, and was sent to Panama for combat training, since the pilots already had flying experience — one of its pilots, 2º Ten.-Av. (2nd Lt.) Alberto M. Torres, was the pilot of the PBY-5A Catalina that had sunk U-199, a German U-boat operating off the coast of Brazil. There 2º Ten.-Av. Dante Isidoro Gastaldoni was killed in a training accident. On May 11, 1944, the group was declared operational and became active in the air defense of the Panama Canal Zone. The group was then sent to the U.S. on June 22 to convert to the Republic P-47D Thunderbolt.

The group departed to Italy on 19 September 1944, arriving at Livorno on 6 October. There it became part of the 350th Fighter Group USAAF, a unit which had been formed on 1 October 1942 in Britain. Several of its first pilots had served previously with the Royal Air Force or the Royal Canadian Air Force. After the Allied landings in Northern Africa (Operation Torch), the 350th FG was transferred to that region and followed the Allied invasion of Italy. Until the arrival of the 1ºGAVCA, the 350th FG was made up of three squadrons: 345th Fighter Squadron ("Devil Hawk Squadron"), 346th FS ("Checker Board Squadron") and 347th FS ("Screaming Red Ass Squadron"). When the 1ºGAVCA — or, rather, the 1st Brazilian Fighter Squadron, 1st BFS — was incorporated to the 350th FG, that unit was subordinated to the 62nd Fighter Wing, XXII Tactical Air Command, 12th Air Force USAAF. The call-signs for each of the group's component squadrons were: 345th FS, "Lifetime"; 346th FS, "Minefield"; 347th FS, "Midwood"; and 1st BFS, "Jambock"

The badge of 1ºGAVCA was designed while the Squadron was travelling to Italy aboard the transport ship UST Colombie by a group of its pilots, Ten.-Av. Rui Moreira Lima, Ten.-Av. José Rebelo Meira de Vasconcelos, Ten.-Av. Lima Mendes and Cap.-Av. Fortunato C. de Oliveira. Drawn by the latter, it can be described as follows, according to its author:

The green-yellow surrounding represents Brazil;
The red field behind the fighting ostrich represents the war skies;
The bottom field — white clouds — represents the ground to a pilot;
The blue shield charged with the Southern Cross is the common symbol for the Brazilian Armed Forces;
The ostrich represents the Brazilian fighter pilot, whose face is inspired by that of Ten.-Av. Lima Mendes;
The white cap was part of the FAB uniform at the time and distinguished the Brazilian pilots from the other Allied pilots;
The gun being held by the ostrich represents the firepower of the P-47, with its eight .50 in machine guns;
The motto "Senta a Pua!" is the war cry of 1ºGAVCA;
The white streak, at the right, ending on a flak burst, was added later, and represents the danger brought by the German anti-aircraft artillery to the pilots (this device appeared only on replacement aircraft).

The use of an ostrich to represent the Brazilian fighter pilots comes from the fact that, during the early Forties, several Brazilian aircrews went to the US to fly back to Brazil the aircraft then being bought in large numbers by the Brazilian authorities, not only training but also combat aircraft. During their stay in that country, they got acquainted to American food: baked beans, powdered eggs and powdered milk, among other items. The then Cel.-Av. Geraldo Guia de Aquino dubbed the pilots "Ostriches" and the nickname caught.

The war cry "Senta a Pua!" was a suggestion from Ten.-Av. Rui who had heard it several times from Cap.-Av. Firmino Alves de Araujo while serving at Salvador Air Base; it was used by the latter on his subordinates, inviting them to do their tasks at once and quickly. It became the Brazilian equivalent of the British "Tally-Ho" and the French "À la Chasse!". It roughly translates to something like "Drill it Deep".

The Brazilian pilots initially flew from 31 October 1944 as individual elements of flights of the 350th FG US squadrons, at first in affiliation flights and progressively taking part in more dangerous missions. Less than two weeks later, on 11 November, the group started its own operations, flying from its base at Tarquinia, using its call-sign Jambock.

The group was divided into four flights, Vermelha (red), Amarela (yellow), Azul (blue) and Verde (green). Each flight had a complement of roughly 12 pilots, these having been flying together since their training spell in Panama. A pilot customarily wore an echarpe in the colours of his flight. The CO of the group and some officers were not attached to any specific flight.

Initially the P-47s were finished in standard US fighter colours, olive-drab (top surfaces) and neutral grey (undersurfaces), except the aircraft of the commanding officer, which was finished in natural metal and olive-drab anti-glare panels. Contrary to common belief, the first aircraft flown by the group's operations officer (coded "2") was also painted in the OD/NG color-scheme, being lost in action when Lt. Danilo Moura was shot down, being replaced by an overall natural metal finish (NMF) aircraft, which was later also shot down when flown by Lt. Luis Lopes Dornelles and replaced by a third NMF machine. The badge of the group was painted just after the engine cowling, and the aircraft code (flight letter-aircraft number) was in white letters over the cowling. National insignia was in four positions, this being the US star-and-bar, with the white star replaced by the Brazilian star. Later, replacement aircraft were in natural metal, with olive-drab anti-glare panels, the codes being in black.

The Brazilian pilots had been trained in the US for fighter operations — but the Luftwaffe had by then nearly no airplanes in Italy. Thus the 1ºGAVCA started its fighting career as a fighter-bomber unit, its missions being armed reconnaissance and interdiction, in support of the US 5th Army, to which the Brazilian Expeditionary Force was attached.

On 16 April 1945, the U.S. Fifth Army started its offensive along the Po Valley. On this date, the group was reduced to 25 pilots, some having been killed and others, having been shot down, becoming POWs. Also, some had been relieved from operations on medical grounds due to combat fatigue. The Yellow flight was thus disbanded, its remaining pilots being distributed among the other flights. Each pilot flew on average two missions a day.

On 19 April, the German frontline was broken, this having been first signalled to Command HQ by the group. The Allied forces had to set up bridgehead across the River Pó, before the German forces crossed it. This was to be done on the 23 April, after a softening up of the German defences by the Air Force on the previous day.

On 22 April 1945, the day dawned cold, overcast and foggy. The three flights took off at five-minute intervals starting at 8:30 AM, to attack targets in the San Benedetto region, destroying bridges, barges and motorized vehicles. At 10:00 AM, a flight took off for an armed reconnaissance mission south of Mantua — more than 80 trucks and vehicles were destroyed. Other aircraft attacked fortified German positions, tanks and barges. By the end of the day, the group had flown 44 individual missions, having destroyed more than a hundred vehicles as well as barges, etc. Two P-47s were damaged and a third was shot down, its pilot, 2º Ten.-Av. Armando de S. Coelho, being taken prisoner. This was the day when more sorties than ever were made by the group, and is commemorated each year as the Brazilian Fighter Arm Day.

The 1ºGAVCA flew a total of 445 missions, 2,550 individual sorties and 5,465 combat flight hours, from 11 November 1944 to 4 May 1945. The XXII Tactical Air Command acknowledged the efficiency of the group by noting that, between 6 and 29 April 1945, it flew only 5% of the total of missions carried out by all squadrons under its control, but destroyed:

- 85% of the ammunition depots,
- 36% of the fuel depots,
- 28% of the bridges (19% damaged),
- 15% of motor vehicles (13% damaged) and
- 10% of horse-drawn vehicles (10% damaged).

On 22 April 1986 the group received from the Ambassador of the U.S. to Brazil, together with the Secretary for the USAF, the Presidential Unit Citation (Air Force), given by the U.S. Government.

Their deeds will remain alive while men fly. Their victories in the battlefields will be in our hearts while courage and heroism are treasured by men.

— E. Aldridge Jr., Secretary for the USAF, at the bestowing ceremony of the Presidential Unit Citation to the 1ºGAVCA

During eight months of the campaign, the Brazilian Expeditionary Force managed to take 20,573 Axis prisoners (two generals, 892 officers and 19,679 other ranks) and had 443 of its men killed in action.

The soldiers buried in the FEB cemetery in Pistoia were later removed to a mausoleum built in Rio de Janeiro. The mausoleum was idealised by Mascarenhas de Moraes (then a Marshal). It was inaugurated on July 24, 1960, and covers an area of 6,850 square meters.

== Timeline ==
- List of wars involving Brazil

== See also ==
- Rebellions and revolutions in Brazil
- South American dreadnought race
- List of rebellions and revolutions in Brazil
