= Battle of Fort Coimbra =

1864 battle of the Paraguayan War

- Part of the Mato Grosso campaign
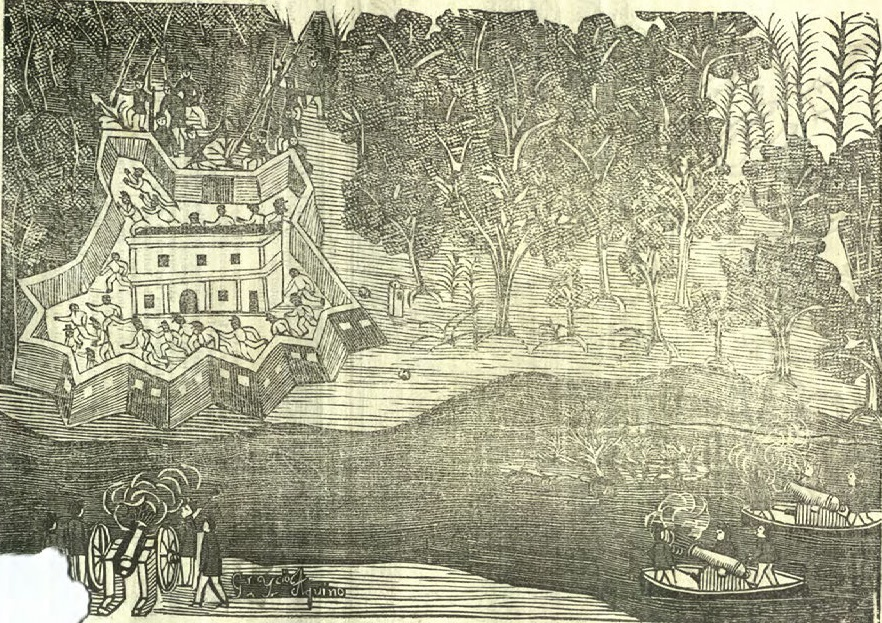
- Paraguayan drawing published in El Cabichuí, depicting cannons firing on the fort and the Brazilian withdrawal.
Date	27–29 December 1864
Location	New Coimbra Fort, Mato Grosso, Brazil 19°55′14″S 57°47′32″W
Result	Paraguayan victory

Belligerents
Empire of Brazil	Paraguay

Commanders and leaders
H. Portocarrero	Vicente Barrios

Strength
125 regulars; 65 irregulars; 11 guns; 1 gunboat	3,200 soldiers; 12 guns; 11 warships

Casualties and losses
None	200 casualties

The Battle of Fort Coimbra (Portuguese: Ataque ao Forte Coimbra; Spanish: Combate del Fuerte de Coimbra) was the opening move of the Paraguayan War's Mato Grosso campaign. It was made of five infantry battalions and two dismounted cavalry regiments, totalling 3,200 men, with 12 rifled guns, a French-equipped rocket battery and the support of 11 warships, all under Colonel Vicente Barrios's command.

== Background ==
Though the fort's commander was Captain Benito de Faria, Lieutenant Colonel Hermenegildo Portocarrero, commander of all artillery in Mato Grosso and of the Lower Paraguay Military District, happened to be there on a routine inspection, and took over its command in view of the Paraguayan attack. He replied to the Paraguayan demands with a letter stating "only through luck and the honor of arms will we deliver the fort". The fort then held 11 functioning bronze smoothbore guns, plus another 20 in need of repairs, and a garrison of 125 regular officers and men, 30 national guardsmen, some customs guards, 6 prisoners and 24 "tame Indians".

== Battle ==
For two days the Paraguayans attacked intensely. The fort's troops' families aided with reloading and the wounded. Lacking the resources necessary to resist the attack and with no reinforcements available nearby, the fort was orderly evacuated between 28 and 29 December by the gunboat Anhambaí. During the action, the Paraguayan forces suffered around 200 casualties from failed assaults and reconnaissance actions, and the Brazilians suffered no losses. The fort and its guns fell under enemy control, and remained under it until April 1868, when the Paraguayans abandoned it, taking away its guns and stores.

== Aftermath ==
After the war ended in 1870, the fort began to be rebuilt. It had suffered extensive damage during the conflict, with its walls being almost completely destroyed by Paraguayan artillery fire.
