= Retreat from Laguna =

- Part of the Mato Grosso campaign
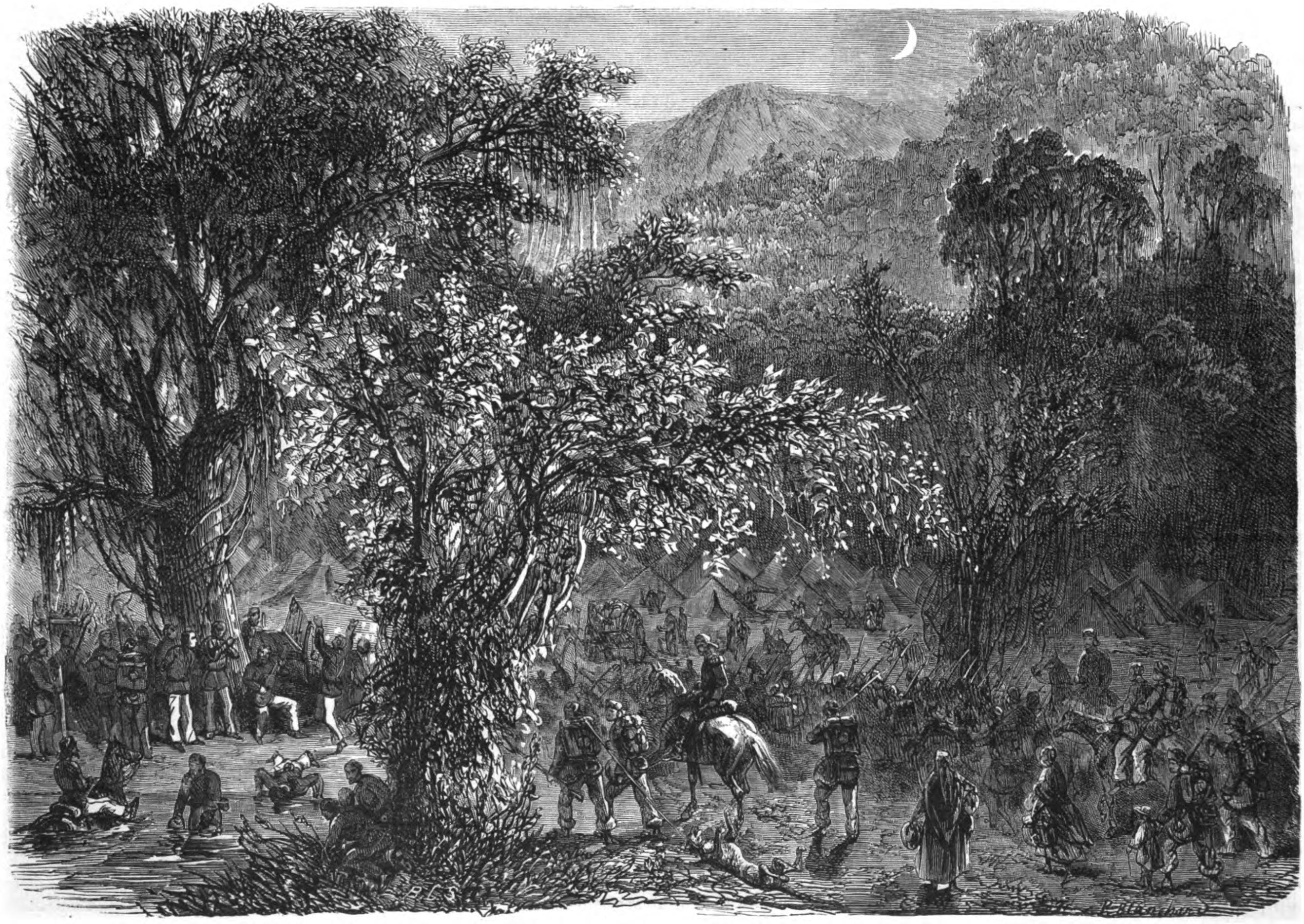
- Expedition of the Imperial Army to Mato Grosso do Sul
Date	May 8 – 11 June 1867
Location	Northern Paraguay, southern Mato Grosso Province
Result	Paraguayan victory

Belligerents
Paraguay	Empire of Brazil

Commanders and leaders
Vicente Barrios; Francisco Isidoro Resquín	Manuel Pedro Drago; Carlos Camisão #

Strength
5,000 soldiers	3,500 soldiers hundreds of indigenous warriors

Casualties and losses
Unknown	2,800

The Retreat from Laguna, also called the Battle of Laguna (A Retirada da Laguna ), was a decisive military engagement fought between the forces of Paraguay and Brazil.

After the invasion of the then province of Mato Grosso (nowadays Mato Grosso do Sul) by the forces of the Paraguayan Army in December 1864, starting the Triple Alliance War (together with the capture of the steamer Marquês de Olinda), one of the first Brazilian moves was to send a military land contingent to fight the invaders in Mato Grosso.

In April 1865, a column left Rio de Janeiro, under the command of Colonel Manuel Pedro Drago, receiving reinforcements in Uberaba in Minas Gerais, covering more than two thousand kilometers by land until it reached Coxim in Mato Grosso, in December of that same year, which was found abandoned. Similarly, Miranda was also found abandoned when it was reached in September 1866.

In January 1867, Colonel Carlos de Morais Camisão assumed command of the column, then reduced to 1,680 men, and decided to invade Paraguay proper, which he penetrated up to where nowadays is Bela Vista, in April of the same year. Too distant from the Brazilian lines, and without food for the troops, affected by cholera, typhus, and beriberi, the column of the Brazilian Army was forced to withdraw under constant attacks of the Paraguayan cavalry, events which all combined led to devastating losses amongst them. These circumstances were famously portrayed by the Viscount of Taunay, who was present as an engineer in the column, in his book A Retirada de Laguna [The Retreat from Laguna].

== Participation of the Terena people ==
An often overlooked fact is that the Amerindians were instrumental in Brazil in this episode. When Brazilian troops withdrew, the Terena and Guaicurus-Kadiweus Indians were the only ones to defend Brazilian territory.

In gratitude for the defense of the homeland, the Kadiwéu were awarded an indigenous reserve by Dom Pedro II, located in the municipality of Bodoquena in Mato Grosso do Sul with an area of approximately 350 thousand hectares.
