= Battle of Alegre =

Naval Battle of Alegre
- Part of the Mato Grosso campaign
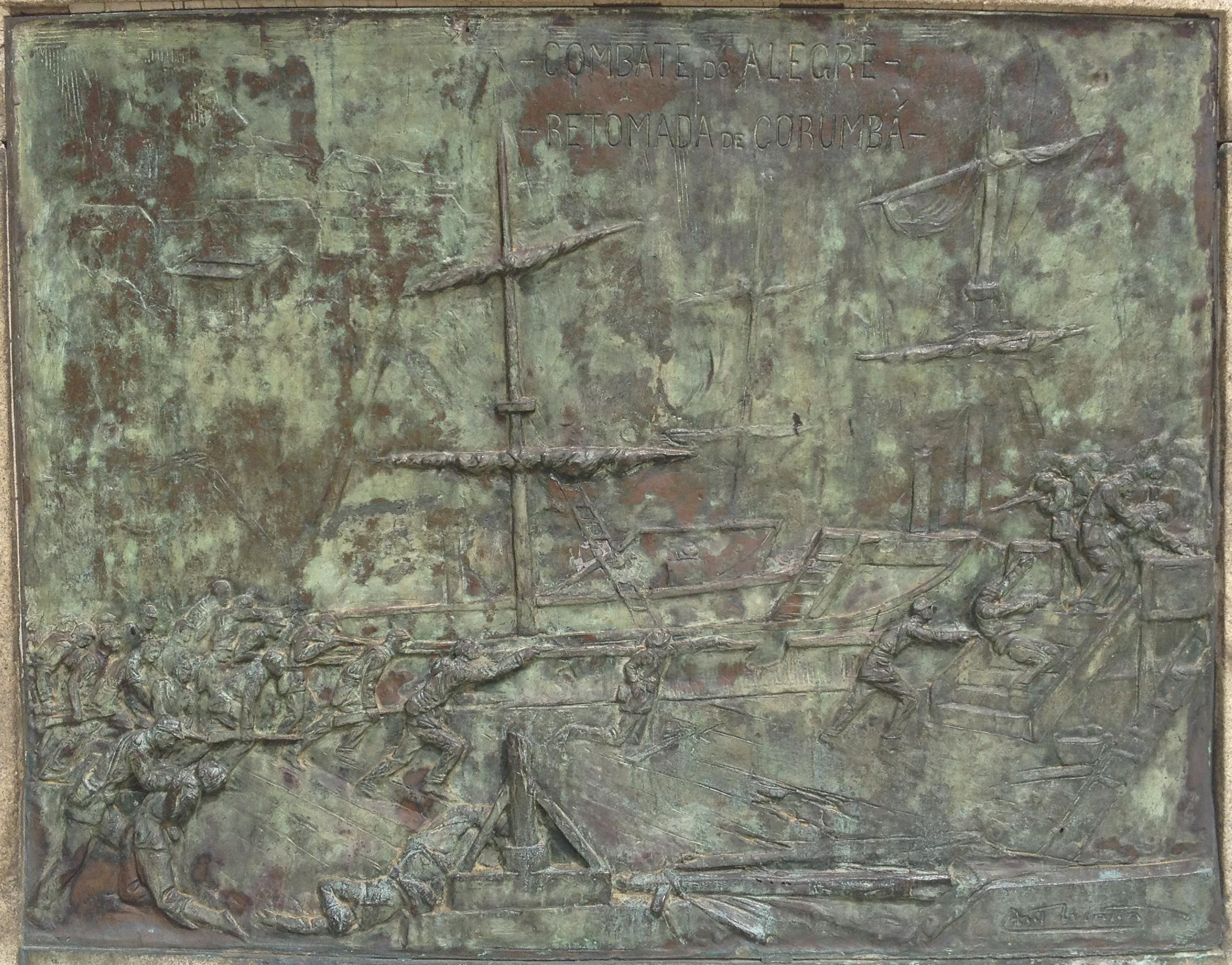
- Battle of Alegre (Monument for the Heroes of Laguna and Dourados, Rio de Janeiro - RJ (Brazil).
Date	July 11, 1867
Location	River São Lourenço, Mato Grosso do Sul, Empire of Brazil
Result	Brazilian victory: Withdrawal of Paraguayan ships

Belligerents
Paraguay	Empire of Brazil

Commanders and leaders
Unknown	Antônio João da Costa

Strength
3 Gunboats	2 Gunboats; 6 Flat-bottomed boats 840 soldiers

Casualties and losses
Unknown; 1 Gunboat burned	33 casualties 1 Gunboat sunk

The Battle of Alegre was a naval battle of the Paraguayan War fought on July 11, 1867, near the city of Corumbá, on the São Lourenço River, present-day Mato Grosso do Sul, between Brazilians and Paraguayans. During the supply of meat, "carnage", for the troops that were there, coming from the resumption of Corumbá, a small squad of Paraguayan vapors had gone up the river in pursuit of the Brazilians, after the first ones had been defeated. The Paraguayan attack was of initial surprise, but they were defeated by the men of Lieutenant Colonel Antônio João da Costa. The loss and reconquest of the Brazilian steam Jauru stood out.

== The naval battle ==
The troops were returning to the capital when, on July 11, Jaurú and Antônio João, who were towing a total of 6 boats, docked at the port of Alegre. Provision of supplies, mainly meat for soldiers, begins. The works are carried out without any concern, when in the afternoon, 3 Paraguayan vapors appear that were in pursuit of the troop that caused them defeat in Corumbá. At this moment the Paraguayan Salto de Guaíra steam of Commander Romualdo Nuñez rises at a fast speed and begins to approach the Brazilian steam Jaurú.

Immediately, a live firearm of artillery placed in the ravines and an engagement with the National Guard snipers of Lieutenant Colonel Antônio João da Costa begins, achieving initial victory in the approach of Jaurú. Soon the steamboat Antônio João comes under the command of Balduíno de Aguiar, a veteran in the battle of the Fort of Coimbra. Brazilian steam forces the withdrawal of Salto de Guaíra and then approaches Jauru, which at that time was controlled by thirty Paraguayans, and takes the ship back to Brazilians again. The fight ended with the victory of the Brazilians to a balance of 33 dead and injured and a sunk ship.

The Paraguayans did not lose any ship, but suffered many human loses.
