= Occupation of Coxim =

- Part of the Mato Grosso campaign
Date	24–25 April 1865
Location	Coxim, Mato Grosso do Sul, Brazil 18°30′25″S 54°45′36″W
Result	Paraguayan victory

Belligerents
Paraguay	Empire of Brazil

Commanders and leaders
Francisco Isidoro Resquín	Antônio Pedro dos Santos

Strength
300 soldiers	7 soldiers (local garrison)

Casualties and losses
None	Unknown, if any
- 50 Paraguayan soldiers died of wounds and disease during the return march.

The Occupation of Coxim, also known as the Battle of Coxim, was a Paraguayan military operation led by Colonel Francisco Isidoro Resquín that resulted in the capture of the village of Coxim, now Mato Grosso do Sul, during the Paraguayan War. Colonel Resquín detached 300 soldiers and some cannons from Miranda, the base camp for the invaders, and headed for the village. The column advanced on horseback and encountered great difficulties in the 120 kilometers of almost impassable terrain. On April 24, 1865, Resquín's column reached the village and found it almost abandoned. Coxim's defense was in charge of only 7 Brazilian soldiers under the command of retired captain Antônio Pedro dos Santos. The fight was fast and without casualties on the Paraguayan side. The Brazilians withdrew to Cuiabá and the invaders looted and burned the village. On their return march, Paraguayan troops lost 50 soldiers to diseases and injuries from the march.

Panic started in Cuiabá when the news of the fall of Coxim arrived. It was said that the Paraguayans were marching to the capital with 8,000 soldiers and a large number of cannons and horses, which never occurred.

== Bibliography ==
- Maestri, Mário (2015). "A invasão paraguaia do sul do Mato Grosso". Contraponto: Revista do Departamento de História e do Programa de Pós-Graduação em História do Brasil da Universidade Federal do Piauí. 4 (2). ISSN 2236-6822.
