= Augusto Leverger, Baron of Melgaço =

French-Brazilian naval officer

Augusto Leverger
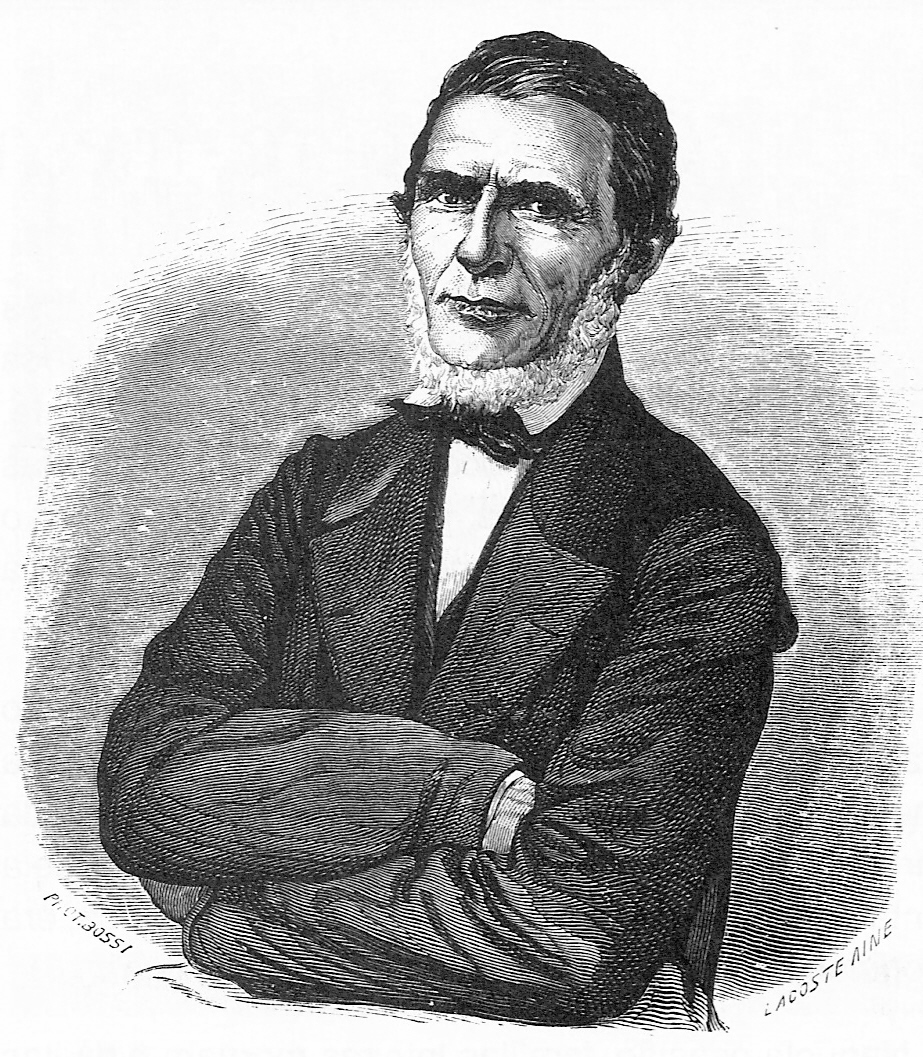

President of Mato Grosso
- In office 11 February 1851 – 1 April 1857
- Preceded by: João da Costa Pimentel
- Succeeded by: Albano de Sousa Osório
- In office 12 May 1863 – 15 July 1863
- Preceded by: Herculano Ferreira Pena
- Succeeded by: Albano de Sousa Osório
- In office 9 August 1865 – 1 May 1866
- Preceded by: Albino de Carvalho
- Succeeded by: Albano de Sousa Osório
- In office 26 May 1869 – 10 February 1870
- Preceded by: José Antônio Murtinho
- Succeeded by: Luís da Silva Prado

Personal details
- Born: 30 January 1802 Saint-Malo, France
- Died: 14 January 1880 (aged 77) Cuiabá, Brazil
- Resting place: Piedade Cemitery, Cuiabá
- Party: Conservative
- Awards: Commander of the Order of Aviz; Officer of the Order of the Rose; Knight of the Order of the Southern Cross
- Nickname: Cuiabá's Breton

Military service
- Allegiance: Empire of Brazil
- Branch/service: Imperial Brazilian Navy
- Years of service: 1825–1857
- Rank: Fleet Admiral
- Commands: 14 de Outubro; General do Rêgo; Commander of Arms of Mato Grosso
- Battles/wars: Cisplatine War; Battle of Barracas; Action of June 16 1828; Triple Alliance War; Invasion of Corumbá

Augusto João Manuel Leverger, Baron of Melgaço (30 January 1802 – 14 January 1880), nicknamed "Cuiabá's Breton", was a French-born Brazilian admiral, writer, historian, geographer and several times president of the province of Mato Grosso in the Empire of Brazil. He was a key figure of Mato Grosso's literary production during his time.

== Biography ==
The surrender of the Argentine corvette General Dorrego, by Edoardo De Martino

Leverger was born to Mathurin Michel Leverger and Regina Corbes in Saint-Malo in Brittany on 30 January 1802. According to his biography, written by Virgílio Correia Filho, he was a seaman since he was very young, having arrived in Brazil in 1824 because of that profession. In 1825 he joined the Imperial Brazilian Navy as a second-lieutenant, fighting in the Cisplatine War and commanding the bombard 14 de Outubro during the Battle of Barracas and the Action of June 16 1828 (being named Knight of the Order of the Southern Cross), and the corvette General Dorrego (renamed General do Rêgo), which was captured from the Argentine Navy in 1828. He arrived in Cuiabá, in southwestern Brazil, in 1830. He had been named to staff the navy arsenal being built there. In 1843, he married Inês de Almeida Leite, a widow.

Via a decree from the Emperor Dom Pedro II, he was named a knight of the Order of the Rose in 1841; he was then a captain-lieutenant of the navy. In 1844, already a frigate captain, he was elevated to officer of the same order. Throughout most of his time in the navy, he was responsible for mapping Mato Grosso's river network. He also was briefly named consul-general in Paraguay after the isolationist dictator Francia's death. Some years before the Platine War started, Juan Andrés Gelly, who had previously been Paraguay's ambassador to Brazil, requested that Leverger be lent to Paraguay as an attaché to aid in reorganizing that country's fleet, but Leverger was then in command of the Brazilian Navy's ships in Mato Grosso, and there were worries about a war with Bolivia, so other officers were sent.

When the Paraguayan War started in 1864, despite having already been retired from the navy, he was responsible for erecting the Melgaço Fortifications that defended Cuiabá from the Paraguayan offensive. Thanks to these efforts, he was granted the title of Baron of Melgaço in 10 November 1865.

Before and after the war, on multiple occasions, he was named president of the province of Mato Grosso by the emperor. Overall, he was president of the province four times (two of these as interim president (Note: The first time lasted but two months, in 1863; the second happened during the Paraguayan War, when Colonel Carneiro, who had been named President of the Province, was taken prisoner by Paraguayan forces as they captured the steamer Marquês de Olinda.)) and vice president once. He was a member of the Conservative Party and also of the Brazilian Historic and Geographic Institute.

He died in 1880 in Cuiabá.

== Honors and legacy ==
The municipalities of Barão de Melgaço and Santo Antônio de Leverger, both in Mato Grosso, are named after him.

During Manuel José Murtinho's government in Mato Grosso (1889; 1891–1895), a monument was raised over his grave in the Piedade Cemitery in Cuiabá. He was the patron of the 1978 class of the Colégio Naval and is also patron of the Mato Grosso Academy of Letters and the Geographical and Historic Institute of Mato Grosso, two institutions that are hosted in his former house. The Brazilian Army's 13th Motorized Infantry Brigade is also named after him.
