= New Coimbra Fort =

18th-century fort in central Brazil

- Forte Novo de Coimbra
- Corumbá, Mato Grosso do Sul, Brazil
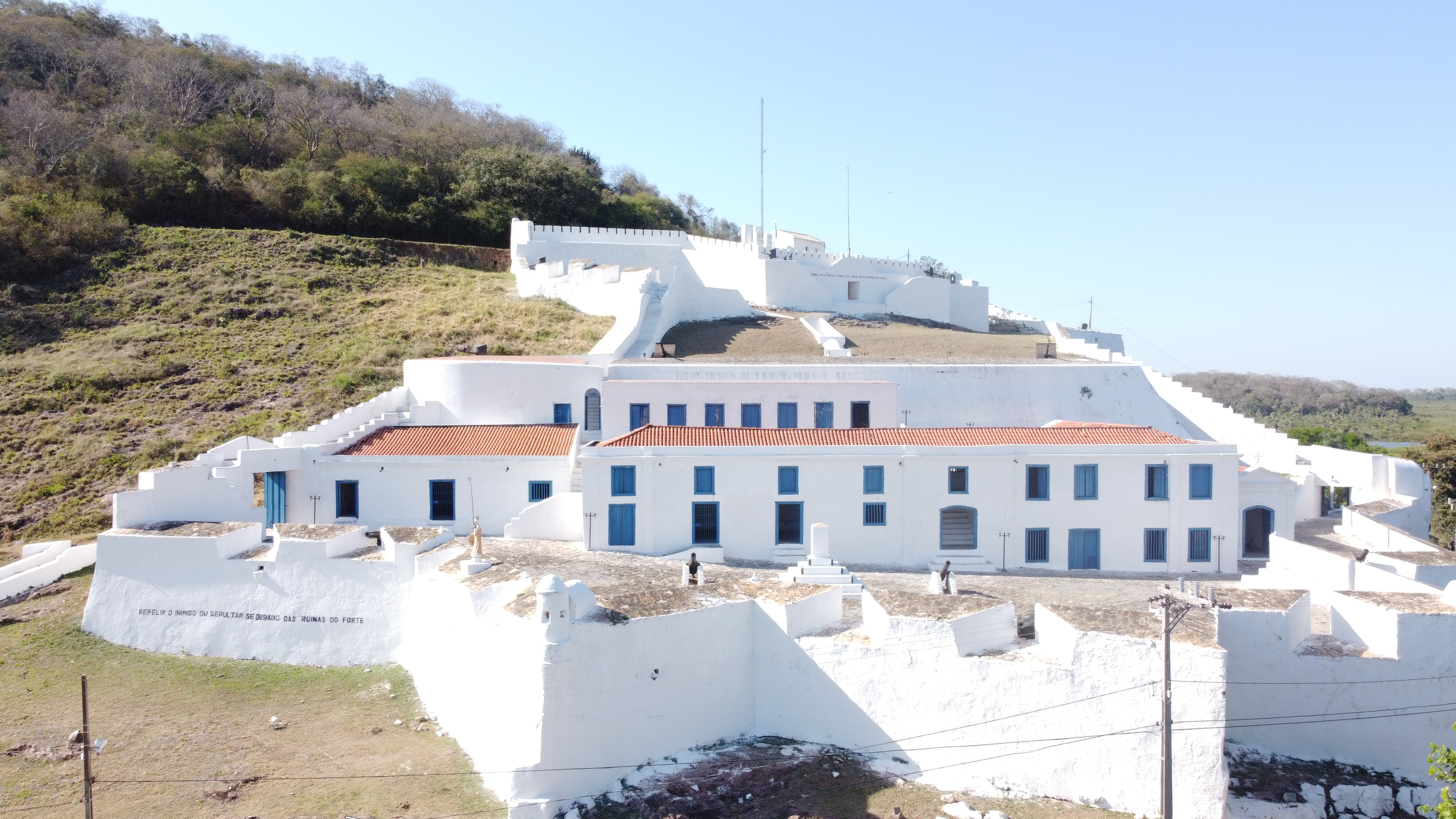
- New Coimbra Fort in 2023

Site information
- Type: Bastion fort
- Controlled by: Brazilian Army
- Website: ebacervo.eb.mil.br/items/show/217

Location
- Location of the New Coimbra Fort in Brazil
- Coordinates: 19°55′13″S 57°47′32″W

Site history
- Built: 1775

National Historic Heritage of Brazil
- Designated: 1974
- Reference no.: 917-T-1974

The New Coimbra Fort (Portuguese: Forte Novo de Coimbra), also known as Fort Portocarrero (Note: A name that stems from Hermenegildo Portocarrero, the Brazilian military officer who commanded the fort's garrison at the start of the Paraguayan War; the fort was never formally named thus, but the Coastal Artillery Group which garrisons it was named Portocarrero Group in his honor.) or simply Fort Coimbra, is a Brazilian military fortification on the Paraguay River, strategically located near the border with Bolivia and Paraguay in Corumbá, in the state of Mato Grosso do Sul, in Brazil. The fort was founded on September 13, 1775, something that had been planned by the Portuguese colonial authorities ever since the new borders with Spain had been fixed in the Treaty of Madrid in 1750.

The fort was besieged in the opening stages of the Paraguayan War by superior Paraguayan forces. The swift evacuation of its defenders under the cover of the night after but a few days of siege was a subject of controversy in Brazil.

Today, it still stands and is occupied by the Brazilian Army, as its position remains strategically relevant in controlling a wide border area. It hosts a display of historical artillery pieces and a chapel, and is listed as a heritage site.

== History ==
=== Background ===
Brazil's western central region, Mato Grosso, had been explored since the early 18th century by bandeirantes from São Paulo and Jesuit missionaries from what is now Paraguay. The border between the Spanish and Portuguese colonial empires in the region needed to be marked, and the Portuguese solution was the New Coimbra Fort, to be built along the lines of the Spanish presidios of the time.

When the first colonial captain-general to the region, António Tavares, arrived in 1751, he started to build up an administration, and to consolidate plans for defense and further expansion; by 1772, when the captaincy's fourth governor, Luís Pereira e Cáceres, arrived to take power, these were already somewhat established. He soon ordered the beginning of the construction of the planned fort on the Paraguay River. Besides the previously planned border demarcation purpose, it would also serve to inhibit the frequent raids by the Payaguá and Kadiwéu peoples. Captain Matias Ribeiro da Costa was sent to accomplish this task, with instructions to build the fort somewhere near where the settlement of Porto Murtinho is located today, some 300 kilometers further downriver than where the fort was actually built (the expedition mistook the location they were in for the planned one). The captain's expedition was made up of 245 men in 15 canoes, guided by an elderly Indigenous man. They set off from Cuiabá on July 22, 1775, and founded the fort on September 13 of the same year. It was called the "Presídio de Coimbra". The place where the fort lies was previously called St. Francis's Narrows, because the Paraguay River became narrower there.

=== The New Coimbra Fort ===
In 1791, due to the poor state of the fort's structure, which had been damaged by a fire and Kadiwéu attacks, the fort was rebuilt in masonry. This was also in part motivated by the Spanish building Forts Borbon and of San Carlos del Apa in the region. Then captain-general Caetano Pinto de Miranda Montenegro ordered it to be built "in the edge of the hill, where two great lengths of the Paraguay River present themselves at an obtuse angle, which will be then flanked by the new fort, something the old base wouldn't do." (Note: This is a translation from the original Portuguese, which reads "na ponta do morro, onde fazem um grande ângulo obtuso dois compridos estirões do [rio] Paraguai, que ficarão flanqueados pelo novo forte, o que não faria a antiga estacada.")

From 1796 onwards, Lieutenant colonel Ricardo Serra, a military engineer and geographer, took charge of the construction. His plans for the fort show the original base besides the new one, which was adapted to its terrain, an irregular star fort. Its walls had loopholes and surrounded the entire fort, accompanying its hill's slope. It had room for two batteries of 8 guns set horizontally, which could fire across each other onto the river. To the southeast, a moat protected the fort from ground assaults. Inside the fort, there was a chapel, an arsenal and quarters for its troops. Ricardo Serra would command the fort until 1806; he was buried in it after his death in 1809.

In September 1801, the new fort was still being built when an expedition composed of four schooners and two canoes, carrying 600 men, attacked it; they were led by Lázaro de Ribeira, the intendant of Paraguay. The fort encroached on Spanish land, as established in the Treaty of Madrid, and news of peace in the War of the Oranges hadn't yet reached the region. The Brazilians had been previously warned by the now friendly Kadiwéu people of the expedition's existence, and, though the fort was garrisoned by only 42 men, it resisted the initial assault and then a 10-day siege, after which the Paraguayans withdrew due to the lack of supplies and storm damage on the ships. Throughout the action, the Paraguayans lost 20 men.

In 1851 the fort's weaponry was improved by the addition of four 24-pounder guns and some smaller 9 and 6 pounder guns which had laid since 1820 in the Guaporé River, planned to be installed at the Forte Príncipe da Beira further north. It was expanded and repaired between 1855 and 1856. In 1855, Mato Grosso's government was briefly transferred to the fort by then-provincial president Augusto Leverger amidst tensions with Paraguay.

Just before the Paraguayan War, the fort's status was reported to the provincial president as follows: "In the 30th of the last month I arrived here from Fort Coimbra, to where I led the province's artillery battalion. Your Excellency will probably have received a memorandum regarding that Fort's condition, as well as other measures taken by the Hon. Sir Commander of Arms, who returned with me that same day; I must tell Your Excellency, nevertheless, that said Fort's state is unsatisfactory, but that it can resist Paraguay's ships and maybe defend itself from land attacks. The Hon. Sir Commander of Arms has ordered some improvements and repairs be made which he understands will be advantageous, and he plans to fortify the Navy's old position in front of the Fort, so that they may fire across from each other and aid each other." (Note: This is a translation from the original Portuguese, which reads: "A 30 do mês findo cheguei aqui de volta do Forte de Coimbra, para onde fui conduzindo o batalhão de artilharia da província. Provavelmente V. Exa. terá recebido uma participação circunstanciada do estado daquele forte, assim como de outras diligências procedidas pelo exmo. Sr. Comandante das Armas, que comigo regressou no mesmo dia; todavia direi à V. Exa. que não é satisfatório o estado do dito forte, contudo pode resistir aos navios do Paraguai e defender-se talvez de seus ataques por terra. O exmo. sr. Comandante das Armas determinou alguns melhoramentos e serviços que entende serão de vantagem, e pretende fortificar a antiga posição da Marinha em frente ao mesmo forte, de modo que, cruzando os fogos, se auxiliem mutuamente.")

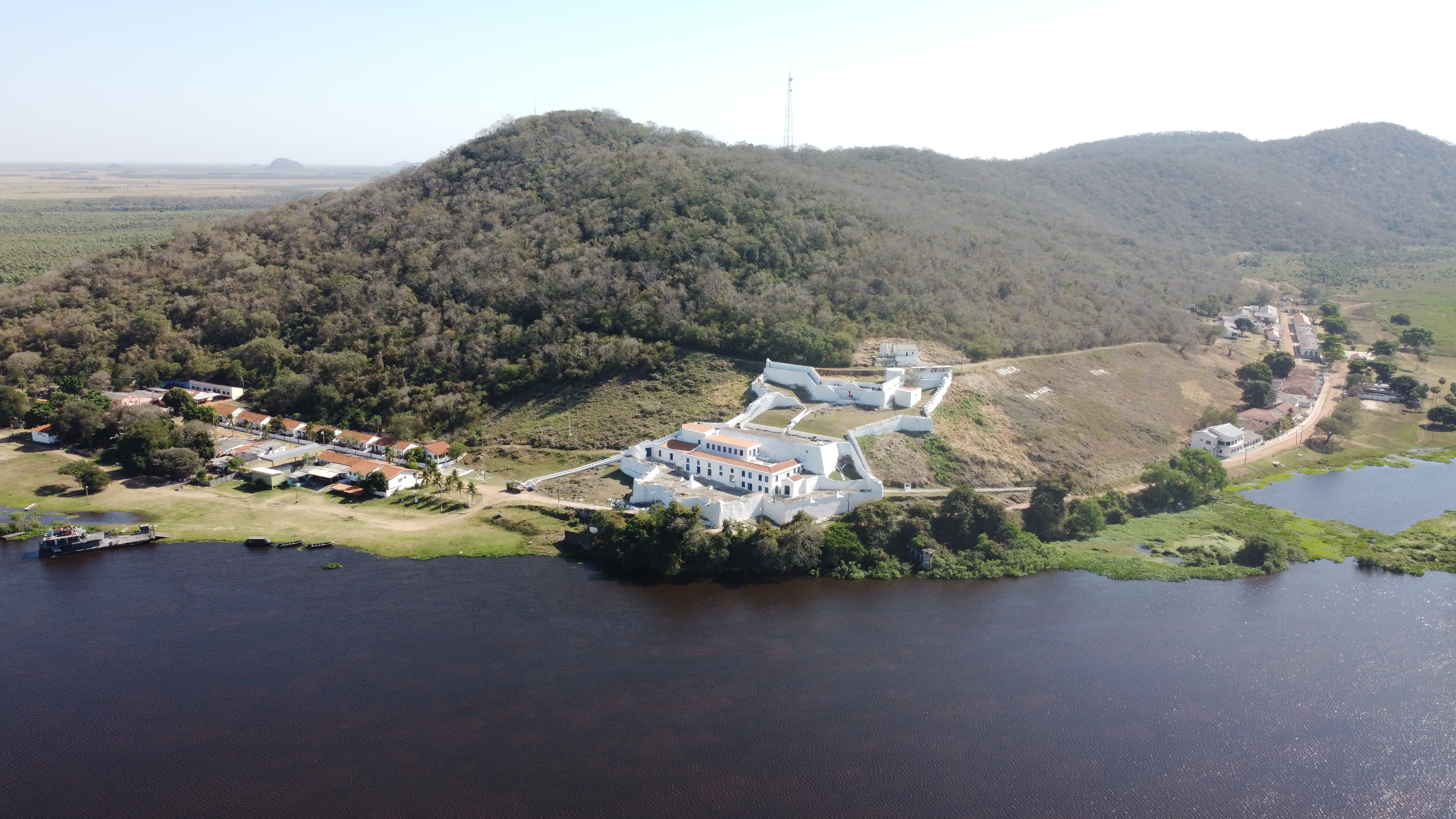
The fort as it lays alongside the river

=== The Paraguayan War ===
A Paraguayan invasion, the opening move of the Mato Grosso campaign, was made of five infantry battalions and two dismounted cavalry regiments, totalling 3200 men, with twelve rifled guns, a French-equipped rocket battery and the support of 11 warships, all under Colonel Vicente Barrios' command. The fort's surrender was demanded on 27 December 1864.

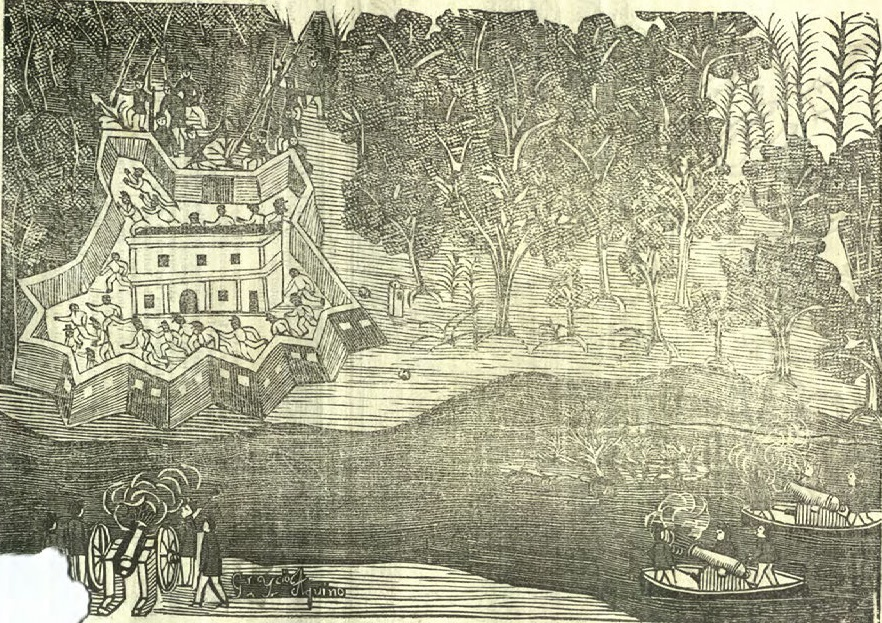
Paraguayan drawing published in El Cabichuí, depicting cannons firing on the fort and the Brazilian withdrawal

Though the fort's commander was Captain Benito de Faria, Lieutenant colonel Hermenegildo Portocarrero, commander of all artillery in Mato Grosso and of the Lower Paraguay Military District, happened to be there on a routine inspection, and took over its command in view of the Paraguayan attack. He replied to the Paraguayan demands with a letter stating "only through luck and the honor of arms will we deliver the fort".

The fort then held 11 functioning bronze smoothbore guns, plus another 20 in need of repairs, and a garrison of 125 regular officers and men, 30 national guardsmen, some customs guards, 6 prisoners, and 24 Indigenous allies. For two days the Paraguayans attacked intensely. The fort's troops' families aided with reloading and the wounded. Lacking the resources necessary to resist the attack and with no reinforcements available nearby, the garrison was evacuated in good order between 28 and 29 December by the gunboat Anhambaí. During the action, the Paraguayan forces suffered circa 200 casualties from failed assaults and reconnaissance actions, and the Brazilians suffered no losses. The fort (and its guns) fell under enemy control, and remained under it until April 1868, when the Paraguayans abandoned it, taking away its guns and stores.

After the war ended in 1870, the fort began to be rebuilt. It had suffered extensive damage during the conflict, with its walls being almost completely destroyed by Paraguayan artillery fire.

=== The 20th century and beyond ===
Between 1907 and 1908, the fort was once again upgraded by the addition of two 120mm Armstrong guns from the ironclad Barroso. New quarters were built beside the fort in 1930. By then, the fort was armed with four 6-inch guns.

The fort was listed as a heritage site by the National Institute of Historic and Artistic Heritage in 1974. It would later host the 3rd Frontier Company - Coimbra Fort, which is part of the 18th Frontier Infantry Brigade of the Brazilian Army's Western Military Command. Said company was designated the Portocarrero Company in 2002 and downsized into a platoon in 2016. The fort also has a display of historical artillery pieces, hosting the following guns:

Name	Image	Type	Origin	Quantity	Usage
Whitworth 32		Rifled muzzle loader	United Kingdom	5	1880–1907
Whitworth 70		Rifled muzzle loader	United Kingdom	3	1880–1907
Nordenfelt 57mm		Light coastal defense gun	United Kingdom	5	1884–1907
Krupp M1903		Field gun	German Empire	2	1907–1940
Armstrong-Whitworth 120mm		Naval gun	United Kingdom	2	1907–1940
Whitworth 152,4mm		Naval gun	United Kingdom	4	1940–1986
Vickers-Armstrong 152,4mm		Field gun	United Kingdom	2	1986–1992

== Legends and traditions ==
There is a local tale that claims that when the fort was being initially built, Thomas the Apostle passed through its first planned site (further downriver from the actual one) on a journey to Peru, which would have made the place holy and unsuitable for military occupation. Amongst the officers of the fort there is a tradition of devoutness to the Virgin of Carmel, and a custom of, when one of them reaches the rank of general, no matter where they are serving, to send back to her shrine in the fort one of the gold stars of their epaulettes.

In the second day of the 1864 siege, an army musician is said, under orders from Portocarrero's wife, to have raised an image of the Virgin of Carmel over the fort's walls and shouted, "Long live Our Lady of Mount Carmel". The Paraguayans stopped firing and started to shout, "Long live Our Lady". This allowed some of the fort's women to discreetly head down to the river to collect water for its defenders.

== See also ==
- 9th Military Region (Brazil)
