= Invasion of Corumbá =

- Part of the Mato Grosso campaign
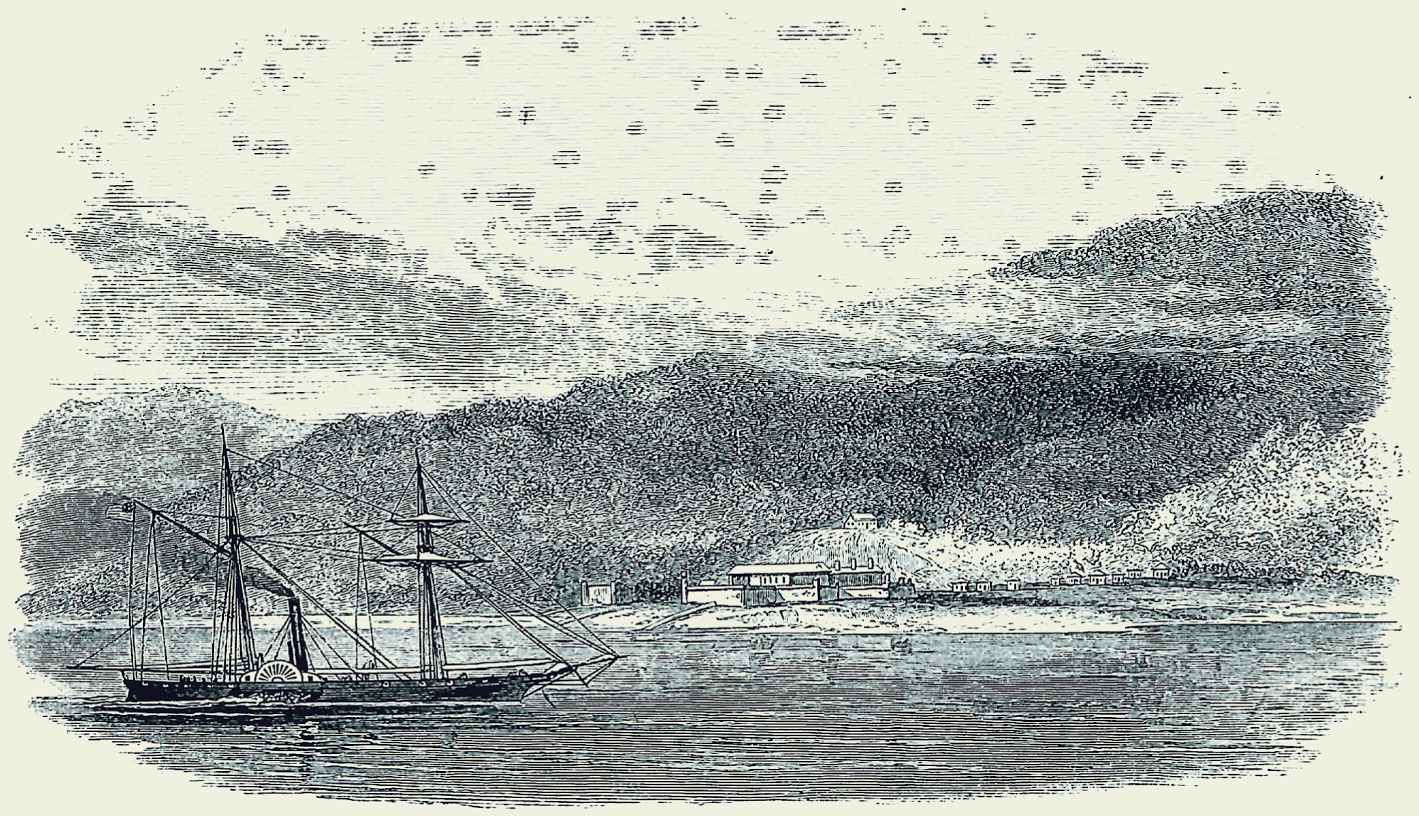
- Novo de Coimbra fort
Date	27 December 1864 – 4 January 1865
Location	Corumbá, Empire of Brazil
Result	Paraguayan victory: Start of Mato Grosso campaign
Territorial changes	Occupation of Corumbá by Paraguay

Belligerents
Paraguay	Empire of Brazil

Commanders and leaders
Vicente Barrios	H. Portocarrero

Strength
5,000 soldiers	195 soldiers

Casualties and losses
212: 44 killed 168 wounded	56: 33 killed 23 wounded

The Corumbá invasion, in the context of the Paraguayan War, was the first Paraguayan movement within the Brazilian territory, starting the Mato Grosso campaign. On 23 December 1864, Solano López sent about 5,000 men across the Paraguay River under the command of colonel Vicente Barrios. This column attacked the Novo de Coimbra fort on the 27th, which capitulated three days later; the Paraguayans then advanced towards Albuquerque, reaching Corumbá on 4 January 1865.

López highlighted about 9,000 men divided into two columns, one commanded by colonel Vicente Barrios and the other commanded by colonel Francisco Isidoro Resquín. The second column, which had 4,000 soldiers, was responsible for operations further south in the province of Mato Grosso in the territory surrounding Dourados, taken on 29 December 1864. The first column, of about 5,000 men, had as a mission to invade Corumbá and territories further north, reaching Coxim.

The first obstacle was the New Coimbra Fort, built by the Portuguese in the 18th century. The Paraguayans, divided into five infantry battalions and two cavalry columns, advanced on the fort on 27 December 1864, which was defended by only 195 Brazilians (155 army soldiers and national guards and the rest civilians), under the command of the lieutenant-colonel Hermenegildo Portocarrero. There were about 31 artillery pieces in the fort, with only 12 of them functioning. The Paraguayans faced fierce resistance from Brazilians who, for three days, prevented the taking of the fort. The wives and relatives of officers prepared powder cartridges, bandages, and treated the wounded as much as possible. With no resources to resist and far from reinforcements, the fort was evacuated in order, on the night of 28 to 29 December, in the Anhambaí gunboat. The fort remained occupied by Paraguayan forces until April 1868, when they abandoned it, leaving their artillery and everything in it.

Having overcome this obstacle, the column headed towards Corumbá following the trail of Portocarrero, passing and invading Albuquerque district on 1 January 1865 without struggle. On 4 January, the Paraguayans reached Corumbá, which at the time was commanded by the colonel Carlos Augusto de Oliveira. When Oliveira heard that the Paraguayans had arrived in the city, he put his troops on a boat and went up the river towards Cuiabá, the capital of the province, leaving the approximately 1,000 inhabitants to fend for themselves. This act infuriated the local military who tried to coward the colonel and some high-ranking military personnel who collaborated with the escape. Paraguayans plundered the city entirely by sending men into forced labor in Paraguay, leaving only children and women who are also forced into forced labor by Paraguayans in the same city.

The total force of Brazilian soldiers deployed in the province of Mato Grosso reached just over 800 men. Given this and the fact that the region was extremely remote, the Paraguayan invasion was a success. Barrios' troops advanced to distant Coxim, hundreds of kilometers to the east in Mato Grosso.
