= Pedro Ignacio Meza =

Paraguayan commodore

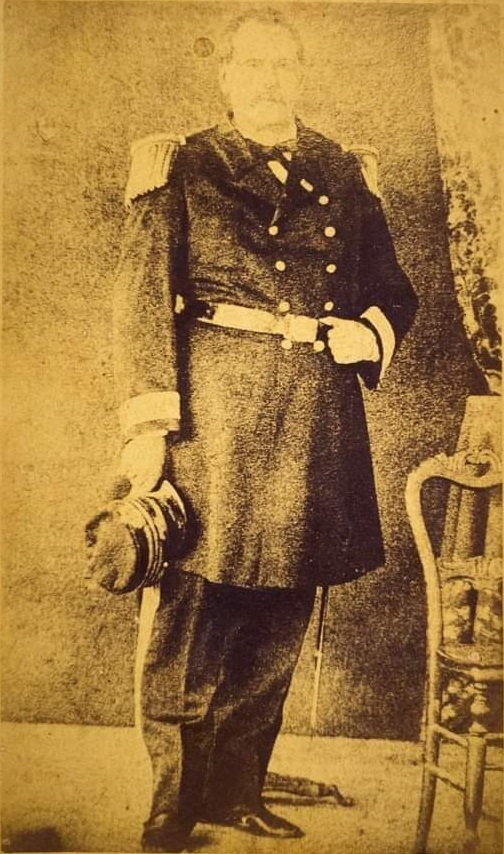
- Born: 1813; Asunción, Paraguay
- Died: 15 June 1865 (aged 51–52); Fortress of Humaitá, Ñeembucú Department, Paraguay
- Military career
- Allegiance: Paraguay
- Branch: Paraguayan Navy
- Service years: 1845–1865
- Rank: Commodore
- Conflicts: Paraguayan War; Corrientes campaign; Battle of the Riachuelo (DOW)

Pedro Ignacio Meza (c. 1813 – 15 June 1865) was a Paraguayan commodore who commanded the Paraguayan Navy in the early years of the War of the Triple Alliance until his death at the Battle of Riachuelo.

== Biography ==
=== Early military career ===
He was born in Asunción, Paraguay in about 1813. He entered the Paraguayan Army as an artillery soldier. In 1841 he was promoted to corporal and in 1844 to sergeant. In 1845 he was assigned to the recently created Paraguayan Navy, and the following year he was placed in command of the smack Independencia del Paraguay with the rank of second lieutenant.

After participating in the Chaco expedition of 1846 of Lieutenant Colonel of Engineers Francisco Wisner de Morgenstern, in 1847 he was promoted to the rank of ship's lieutenant and appointed commander of the schooner República del Paraguay. In 1850 he was placed in command of the sloop Marte 1 and in 1854 he was appointed commander of the steamer Río Blanco and of the Paraguayan squadron. In 1857 he was promoted to lieutenant commander and took direct command of the steamer Tacuarí, the flagship of the fleet. In 1858 he was promoted to the rank of frigate captain. 2 In 1859, he went with Justo José de Urquiza from Asunción to Paraná, Argentina with the Tacuarí after his mediation in an incident between Paraguay and the United States, and later with the then Minister of War Francisco Solano López in his mediation between the State of Buenos Aires and the Argentine Confederation.

=== War of the Triple Alliance ===
In 1863 he gave command of the Tacuarí to First Lieutenant, Remigio Cabral. When the Paraguayan War broke out, he commanded the Paraguayan fleet in the Mato Grosso campaign of 1864.

He was in command of the squadron that on 13 April 1865 captured the Argentine steamships 25 de Mayo and Gualeguay off Corrientes which triggered the Argentine intervention in the conflict. Once the Paraguayan invasion of Corrientes began, he transported the Division of General Wenceslao Robles who was occupying the city.

He commanded the Paraguayan squadron in the Battle of Riachuelo on 11 June 1865. During the combat he was seriously wounded when boarding the enemy steamship Parnahyba, dying four days later in the hospital of the Fortress of Humaitá. He was posthumously honored with the rank of Commodore by the Paraguayan government.
