= Francisco Isidoro Resquín =

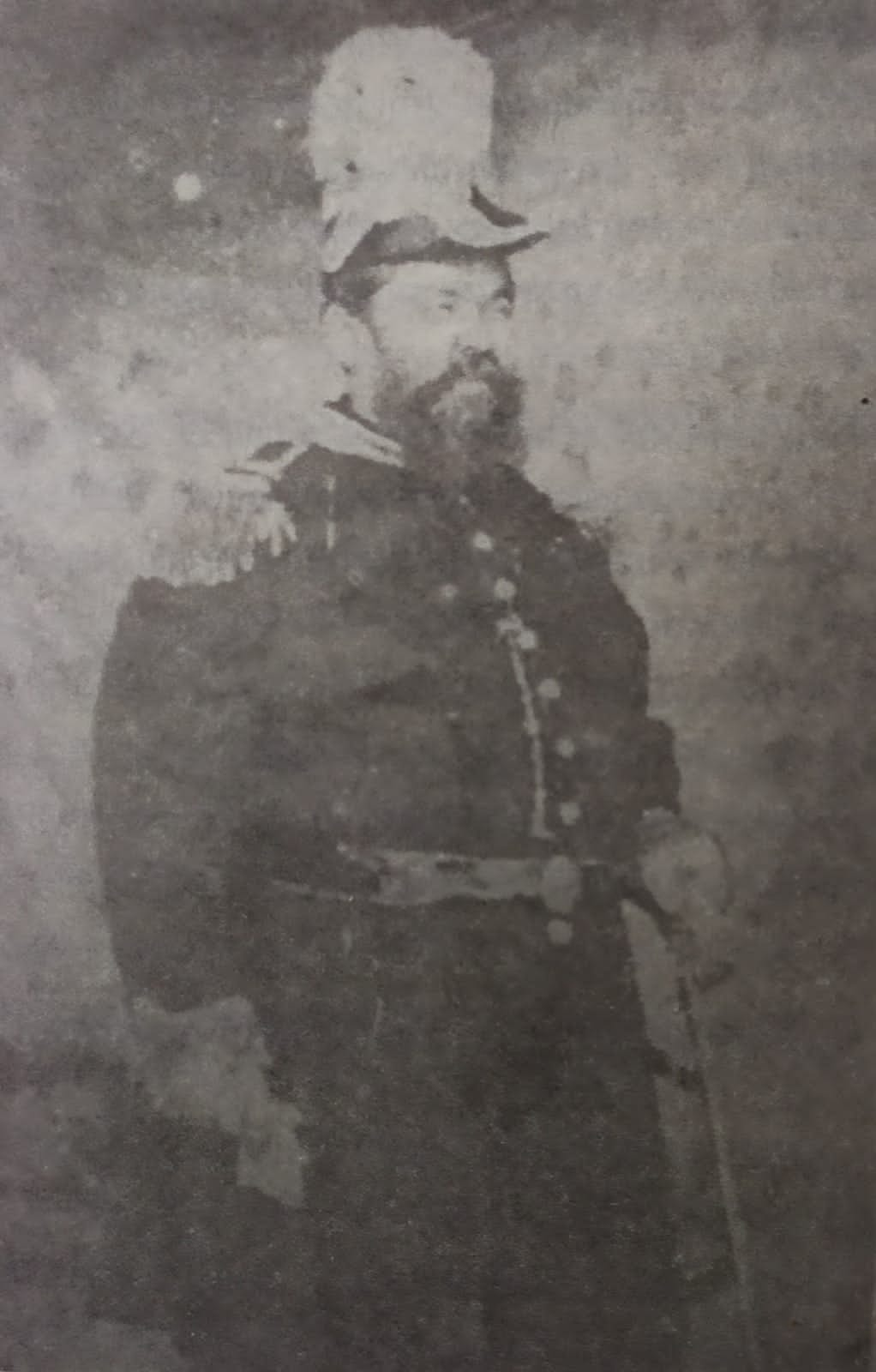
- Born: 2 January 1824; Asunción, Paraguay
- Died: 1882 (aged 57–58); San Pedro de Ycuamandiyú, San Pedro, Paraguay
- Military career
- Allegiance: Paraguay
- Branch: Paraguayan Army
- Conflicts: Paraguayan War; Mato Grosso campaign; Invasion of Corumbá; Battle for Colônia Militar dos Dourados; Battle of Nioaque; Occupation of Coxim; Retreat from Laguna; Corrientes campaign; Battle of Pehuajó; Humaitá campaign; Battle of Tuyutí; Pikysyry campaign; Battle of Lomas Valentinas
- Other work: Historian

Francisco Isidoro Resquín Xara (2 January 1824 – 1882) was a Paraguayan general during the War of the Triple Alliance. Francisco Solano López thought highly of him and his writings are one of the main primary sources on the conflict.

== Biography ==
After completing his first studies at the school of his teacher Téllez in Asunción, 1 in 1841, during the government of Carlos Antonio López, Resquín joined the Paraguayan Army.

In 1849 he was a captain and in 1859, was promoted to colonel. With his hierarchy, he was part of General López's entourage in his mediation before the War between the Argentine Confederation and the state of Buenos Aires. Upon his return he was appointed commander of the Concepción garrison, where he organized a cavalry corps that would have an outstanding performance in the Mato Grosso campaign.

When General Wenceslao Robles fell from grace, in June 1865, Resquín was promoted to brigadier general and appointed commander of the South Division. By order of the Marshal he retreated to Paraguay by crossing the Paraná River with his troops and more than one hundred thousand heads of cattle from the Corrientes Province that were herded by his army.

His performance in the Battle of Tuyutí earned him the National Order of Merit and the functions of Chief of the General Staff of López.

He fought in the Battle of Lomas Valentinas on December 26, 1868. 1 He established the Headquarters in Ascurra, Resquin assumed command of the 1st Army Corps and organized the withdrawal of López, his cabinet and entourage. He was promoted to major general in San Estanislao, Resquin continued in the vanguard of the retreat to organize the camp at Cerro Corá.

Juan Crisóstomo Centurión affirmed that with regard to the events of Cerro Corá, the Historical Relationship of Resquín is inaccurate and has little value because it is that of

A man who observed a conduct not worthy of the high rank that he invested, when surrendering, as a prisoner of war.

However, the Paraguayan historian Juan E. O'Leary affirms that:

... it was, alongside the Marshal, the Chief of our General Staff, rendering invaluable services in the constant reorganization of our troops, decimated in hard battles and in the most painful operations. . And it was, always loyalty and self-denial… ».

He remained a prisoner of war in Brazil until his return to Paraguay, when President Juan Bautista Gill entrusted him with the organization of the first postwar Paraguayan army.

General Resquín died in San Pedro de Ycuamandiyú in 1882.

He was the only Paraguayan general of the war who left written testimony, his work was titled Historical Data of the Paraguayan War against the Triple Alliance.

A witness portrays him like this:

«Among the diners are […] Francisco Isidoro Resquín, a stubborn and fat brunette […]».
