= Battle of Punta Lara =

1828 Cisplatine War naval battle

- Part of the Cisplatine War
Date	June 19, 1828
Location	Punta Lara, Argentina
Result	Indecisive

Belligerents
Empire of Brazil	(Argentina) United Provinces

Commanders and leaders
João das Botas	William Brown

Strength
2 corvettes 3 brigs 3 schooners	1 brig 5 schooners 1 smack 4 gunboats

Casualties and losses
Unknown	Unknown casualties 6 captured

The Battle of Punta Lara was a naval battle between an Argentine and a Brazilian fleet in the closing months of the Cisplatine War. It ended indecisively; as the battle took place near an Argentine defensive battery, they kept the field.

== Background ==
In early April 1827 Argentina and Brazil fought in the Battle of Monte Santiago, which ended in a decisive victory for Brazil. This represented, for all intents and purposes, the end of Admiral William Brown's campaign to challenge the Brazilian blockade of the Río de la Plata; afterwards, there would be no more head-on fights against the main Brazilian fleets, only isolated elements from these, as their superiority, already established before said battle, was thence uncontestable. Argentina then generalized corsair expeditions, raiding the southern Brazilian coasts to great effect. By mid-June 1828, said corsair expeditions meant that Republican naval strength in Buenos Aires was reduced.

=== Skirmish with the Brandsen ===
On the morning of either 16 or 17 June, the Brazilian blockading squadron, under James Norton, intercepted the corsair brig Brandsen under George De Kay, which was aiming to elude the blockade in order to embark into another raiding expedition. Fleeing its pursuers, it got stuck in a sandbank near the Ensenada de Barragán, but in range of defensive batteries installed there, which meant that a first attempt at boarding it by the Imperials was foiled. The Argentine brig then offered fierce resistance until its ammunition was exhausted, at which point De Kay had the ship scuttled. Most of its crew made it to the defensive batteries on the shore, from where they kept fighting, but some of them remained aboard, so that 28 of them were made prisoners by the Brazilians. The latter, unable to move the ship, set it on fire, as they did the 9 de Janeiro, one of their brigs which had also gotten stuck on the action. Norton would lose an arm due to a wound obtained in this action. The Brazilians suffered 32 dead and four prisoners through this action.

== Action of 19 June 1828 ==
The Republican fleet in Buenos Aires, composed of eight small ships, sailed off on the afternoon of 18 June to try to rescue what remained of the Brandsen, but the winds were against them, making it so that when they arrived, the morning of the next day, it was already too late to save the ship. On site were still some Brazilian ships, two corvettes, three brigs and three schooners, against which the Argentine fleet fought from 8:30 in the morning until 4 in the afternoon. The brig Níger was the Brazilian flagship, with Commodore João das Botas aboard to take over command from the wounded Commodore Norton.

During the battle, one of the Argentine gunboats found itself in an unfavourable position facing an enemy brig, and surrendered, with its crew being taken prisoner and the squadron's signal code falling into the hands of the Brazilians. Eventually, though, the gunboat was recaptured by the Argentines. They then managed to withdraw into the Ensenada's shallow waters. On the next day, they managed to recover some guns and supplies from the 9 de Janeiro, also nearby. Both it and the Brandsen were too damaged to be recovered and were set aflame.
