= Carlos de Morais Camisão =

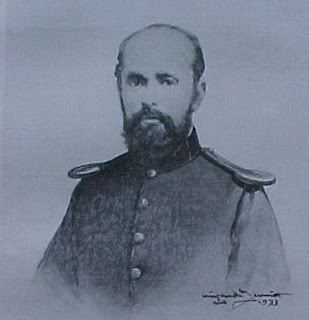
- Colonel Camisão
- Born: 8 May 1821; Rio de Janeiro, Kingdom of Brazil
- Died: 29 May 1867 (aged 46); Jardim, Empire of Brazil
- Military career
- Allegiance: Empire of Brazil
- Branch: Imperial Brazilian Army
- Rank: Colonel
- Conflicts: Paraguayan War; Mato Grosso campaign; Invasion of Amambay; Battle of Laguna Farm; Retreat from Laguna #

Carlos de Morais Camisão (8 May 1821 – 29 May 1867) was a Brazilian colonel of the Paraguayan War. He was one of the leaders of the retreat from Laguna, with Alfredo d'Escragnolle Taunay. He took command of the Brazilian force counter-attacking the Paraguayan invasion during the Mato Grosso campaign, but died of cholera during the retreat.

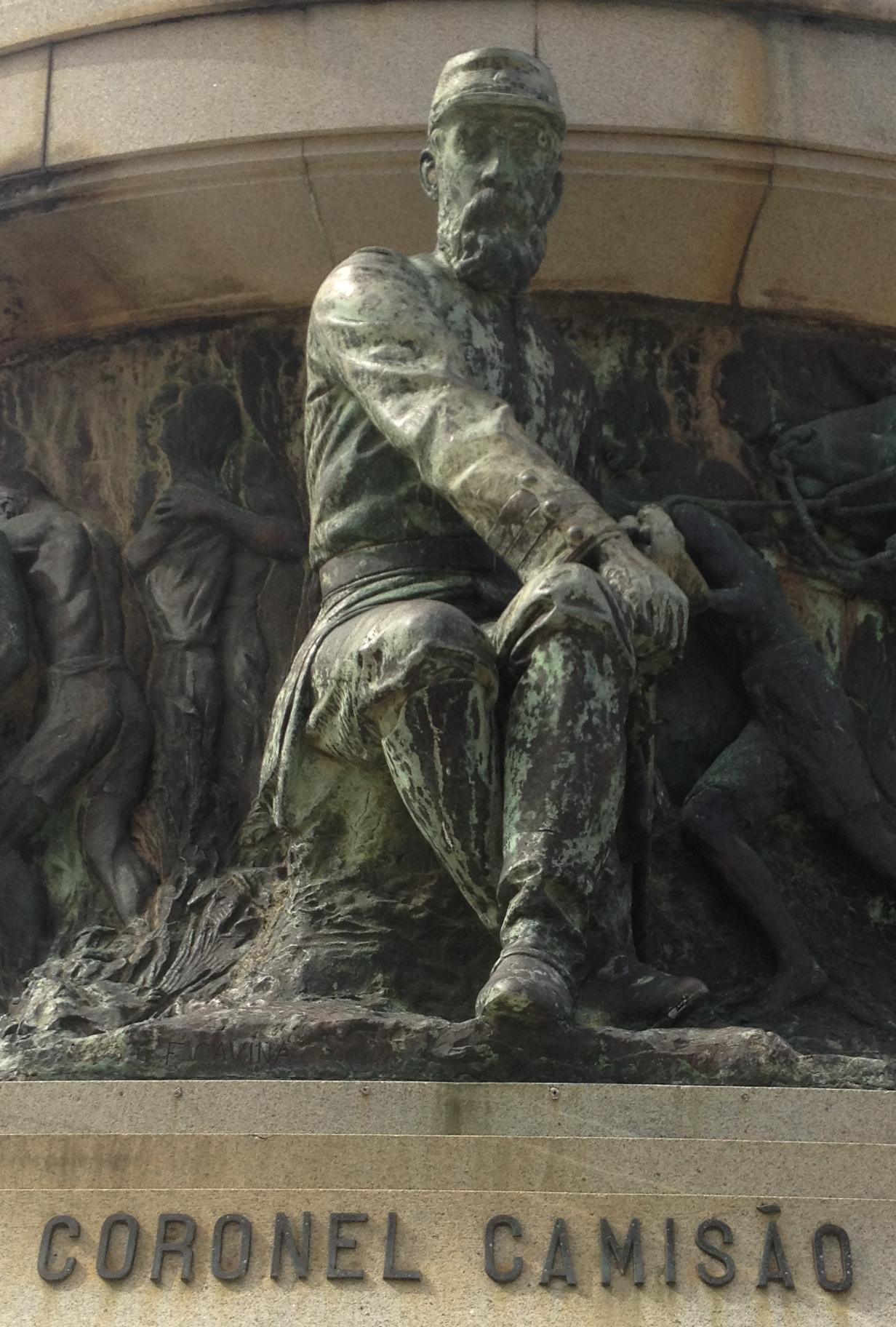
Colonel Camisão in the Monument to the heroes of Laguna and Dourados, Rio de Janeiro

== Biography ==
He was born in Rio de Janeiro and died in Jardim.

== Awards ==
- He was a Knight of the Order of Christ, since 21 January 1849.
- He was an Imperial Knight of the Order of the Rose, since 16 March 1849.
- He was a Knight of the Order of Aviz, since 10 July 1860.
