= Barão de Melgaço, Mato Grosso =

Coordinates: 16.2789°S 55.9578°W

Barão de Melgaço
- Municipality
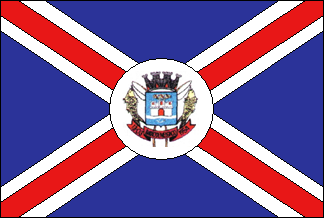
- Flag

- Location in Mato Grosso
- Country: Brazil
- Region: Center-West
- State: Mato Grosso
- Mesoregion: Centro-Sul Mato-Grossense

Population (2020)
  - Total: 8,164
- Time zone: UTC−3 (BRT)

Barão de Melgaço is a municipality in the state of Mato Grosso in the Central-West Region of Brazil.

The municipality contains 43% of the 108,960-hectare (269,200-acre) Encontro das Águas State Park, created in 2004.

The city is named for Augusto Leverger, Baron of Melgaço, a Brazilian Navy admiral during the Paraguayan War.

== See also ==
- List of municipalities in Mato Grosso
