= Mato Grosso campaign =

Campaign of the Paraguayan War

- Part of the Paraguayan War
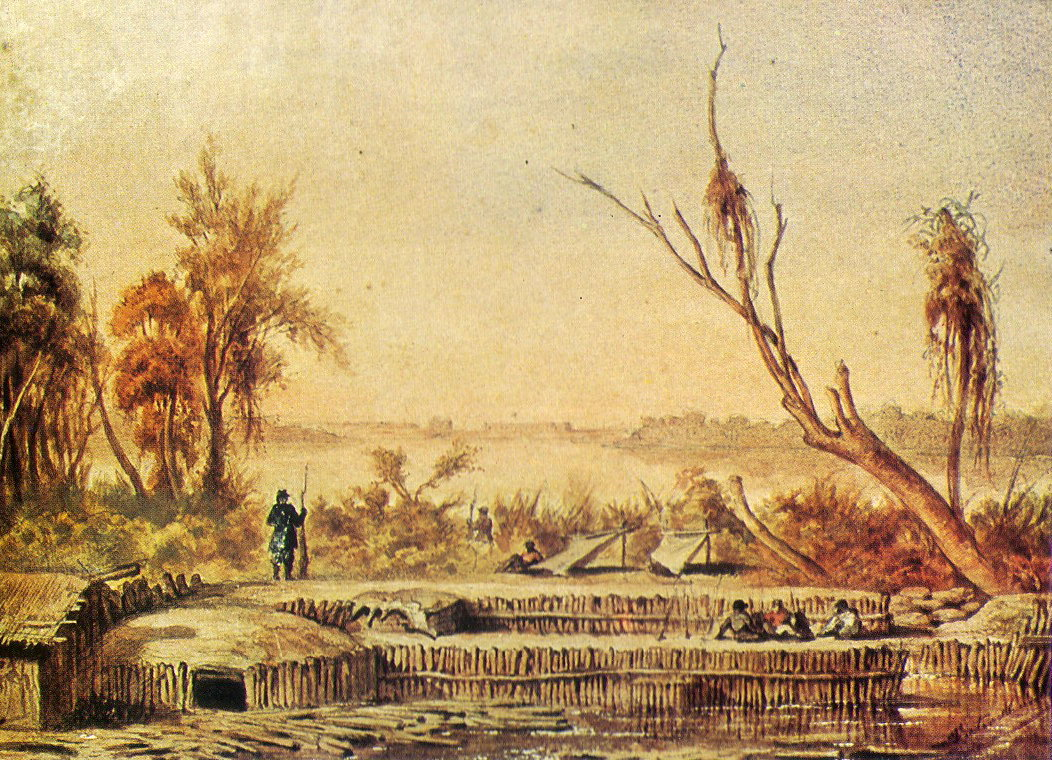
- Paraguayan fortification
Date	December 1864 – April 1868
Location	Mato Grosso province, present-day Mato Grosso do Sul, Brazil
Result	Initial Paraguayan conquest; Paraguayan withdrawal in 1868

Belligerents
Paraguay	Empire of Brazil

Commanders and leaders
Solano López; Vicente Barrios; Isidoro Resquín; Pedro Ignacio Meza; B. Caballero; Martín Urbieta	Carlos Camisão #; H. Portocarrero; Rufino Galvão; Antônio João †; Antônio Coelho; Enéas Galvão; Pedro Rufino

Strength
7,898 men 11 ships 12 guns	3,800–3,900 men 8 ships 11 guns

Casualties and losses
432–489 total casualties 1 ship burned	2,983 total casualties 2 ships captured 1 ship sunk

The Mato Grosso campaign was an early Paraguayan offensive in the Paraguayan War. Paraguay invaded the Brazilian province of Mato Grosso (now Mato Grosso do Sul). Paraguay captured part of the Brazilian province of Mato Grosso, but it was a pyrrhic victory, since they obtained little gain in it.

== Paraguayan offensive ==
Paraguay took the initiative during the first phase of the war: invading Mato Grosso in the north on 14 December 1864, Rio Grande do Sul in the south in early 1865, and the Argentine province of Corrientes.

Two separate Paraguayan columns invaded Mato Grosso simultaneously. An expedition of 3,248 troops, commanded by Colonel Vicente Barrios, was transported by a naval squadron under the command of Frigate Captain Pedro Ignacio Meza, up the Paraguay River to the town of Concepción. They attacked the New Coimbra Fort on 27 December. The Brazilian garrison of 154 men resisted for three days, under the command of Lieutenant Colonel Hermenegildo Portocarrero (later Baron of Forte Coimbra). When their munitions were exhausted, the defenders abandoned the fort and withdrew up the river towards Corumbá on board the gunboat Anhambaí.

After occupying the fort, the Paraguayans advanced north, taking the city of Corumbá in January 1865. Barrios then sent a detachment to attack the military frontier post of Dourados. This detachment, led by Major Martín Urbieta, encountered tough resistance on 29 December 1864 from Lieutenant Antônio João Ribeiro and his 16 men, who were all eventually killed. The Paraguayans continued to Nioaque and Miranda, defeating the troops of Colonel José Dias da Silva. Coxim was taken in April 1865. The second Paraguayan column, formed from some of the 4,650 men led by Colonel Francisco Isidoro Resquín at Concepcion, penetrated into Mato Grosso with 1,500 troops.

Despite these victories, the Paraguayan forces did not continue to Cuiabá, the capital of the province, where Augusto Leverger had fortified the camp of Melgaço to protect it (he would later be granted the title of Baron of Melgaço for this). Their main objective was the capture of the gold and diamond mines, disrupting the flow into Brazil until 1869.

== Brazilian counter-offensive ==
Brazil sent an expedition to fight the invaders in Mato Grosso. A column of 2,780 men led by Colonel Manuel Pedro Drago left the town of Uberaba in Minas Gerais in April 1865, and crossed the Apa River into Paraguay in April 1867. In January 1867, Colonel Carlos de Morais Camisão had assumed command of the column after the deaths of Drago and Galvão. The column numbered 1,907 men by April.

President Solano López sent the 21st Cavalry Regiment to Concepción to reinforce the cavalry under the command of Martin Urbieta. Despite winning the Battle of Baiende and Battle of Nhandipá, Colonel Camisão was forced to retreat due to lack of supplies, which further reduced his force to 578 men. Though he died of cholera along the way, the remnants of his force reached Canuto on 11 June.
