= Vicente Barrios =

Paraguayan general and politician

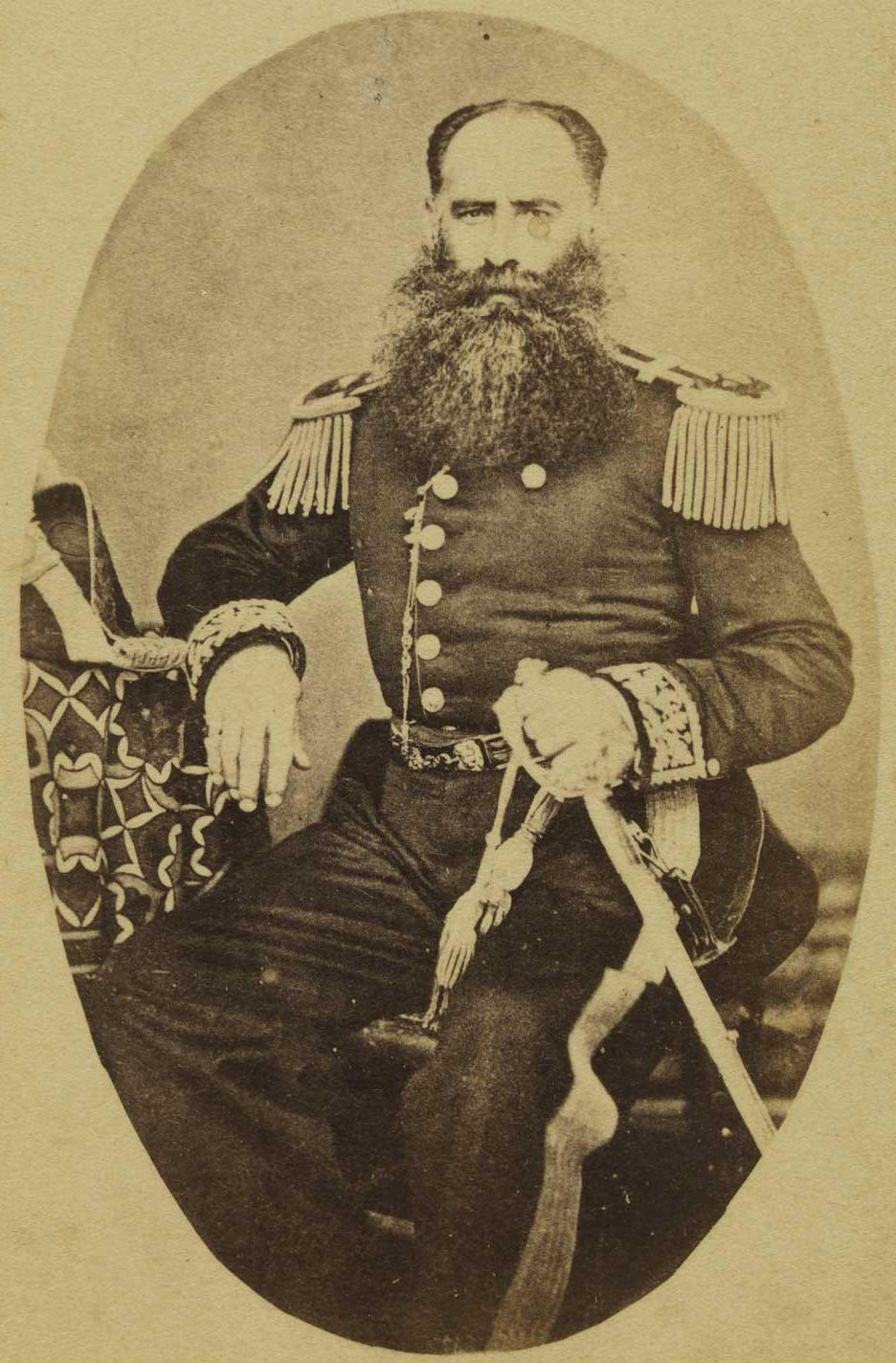
- Born: c. 1825; Asunción, Paraguay
- Died: 21 December 1868 (aged 42–43); Central Department, Paraguay
- Military career
- Allegiance: Paraguay
- Branch: Paraguayan Army
- Service years: 1843–1868
- Rank: Brigadier general
- Conflicts: Paraguayan War; Mato Grosso campaign; Invasion of Corumbá; Humaitá campaign; Battle of Tuyutí; Second Battle of Tuyutí

Vicente Barrios Bedoya (c. 1825 – 21 December 1868) was a Paraguayan general and politician who was the son-in-law of President Carlos Antonio López. Under López and his successor, Marshal and President Francisco Solano López, Barrios held many positions throughout the earlier years of the Paraguayan War and participated in the earlier battles and campaigns of the war.

== Biography ==
Barrios joined the Paraguayan Army in 1843 and quickly made a career. In 1847 he was promoted to captain and in 1853, to lieutenant colonel. As such, he was one of the entourages of Francisco Solano López during his 1853–1854 tour of Europe. This journey, on which his father had sent him, primarily had the purpose of acquiring modern ships and armaments, but also of recruiting scientists, technicians and settlers for Paraguay. After returning to Paraguay, López was appointed vice president by his father, and Barrios was promoted to colonel. Due to his rank, he also took over the management of a colonization project that ultimately failed in 1855, with which the present-day town of Villa Hayes being meant to be re-established as "New Bordeaux" by French immigrants.

In 1856, Barrios married López's sister Inocencia, becoming a member of the country's social elite and brother-in-law to Francisco Solano López, who succeeded his father as president in 1862. After López's declaration of war on Brazil, Barrios was appointed supreme commander of the two army units of 5,000 men that invaded the Brazilian province of Mato Grosso from Alto Paraguay on separate routes from mid-December 1864. The Mato Grosso campaign by Paraguayan forces was of little strategic use to the country, but it brought in significant amounts of arms and ammunition, as well as tens of thousands of head of cattle and other loot. Barrios also took the opportunity to enrich himself personally and had large quantities of stolen goods transported by ship to Paraguay for himself and his brother-in-law.

Upon his return from the Mato Grosso, Barrios was promoted to brigadier general and appointed Minister of War and Navy. In this position, he succeeded Venancio López, brother of the President. Barrios remained in this position, even after he was recalled to active military service after an army from the Triple Alliance countries of Argentina, Brazil and Uruguay invaded Paraguayan territory.

On 24 May 1866, Barrios commanded one of the four Paraguayan assault columns in the Battle of Tuyuti. On this battle, conceived by López as a large-scale surprise attack designed to smash the Allied army and drive it back out of Paraguay, ended in a heavy defeat for his force. The coordination of the Paraguayan army units, which had to march through difficult terrain, was unsuccessful. As a result, they had not attacked simultaneously, but one after the other attack column as they had only reached their area of operations a few hours after the start of the battle and had been repulsed with heavy losses.

In November 1867, López decided to attack the Allied army camp again and put his brother-in-law in command of the attacking force. The ensuing Second Battle of Tuyuti ended in another defeat of the Paraguayans, but López was pleased with the amount of guns and supplies that had been captured or destroyed by his army during the battle and promoted Barrios to major general.

However, the relations between the two men fell off after the Imperial Brazilian Navy had succeeded in February 1868 in overcoming the Paraguayan river barriers at the Humaitá fortress and shelling the capital Asunción for the first time. López accused Barrios of treason and had him placed under house arrest. The subsequent hunt for actual and alleged conspirators, which led to a wave of executions known as the San Fernando massacre, ultimately also made Barrios a victim. After a previous suicide attempt, he was shot on 21 December 1868, on López' orders.

Barrios' wife, was also arrested and accused of treason but survived the brutal treatment in prison and the war. She later had a child with a Brazilian officer rumored to be General José Antônio Correia da Câmara.
