= 9th Military Region (Brazil) =

Coordinates: 20.4640°S 54.6447°W

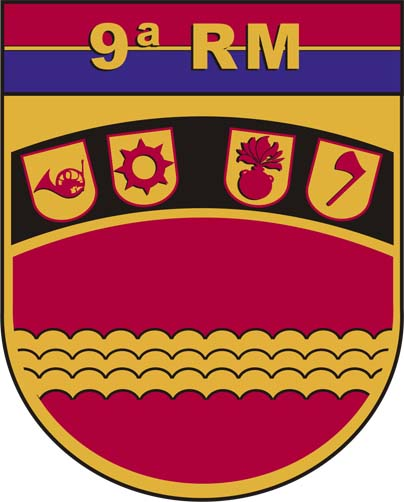
- Coat of arms
- Active: 1821
- Country: Brazil
- Allegiance: Brazilian Army
- Part of: Western Military Command
- Garrison/HQ: Campo Grande, Brazil
- Nickname: Mello e Cáceres Region
- Website: 9rm.eb.mil.br

Commanders
- Current commander: Col. Pedro A. L. Varandas

Jurisdiction of the Comando Militar do Oeste

The 9th Military Region (Portuguese: 9.ª Região Militar, 9.ª RM) is an administrative command of the Brazilian Army based in Campo Grande, Mato Grosso do Sul, with jurisdiction over that state and Mato Grosso. It corresponds to the area of the Western Military Command, to which the region is subordinated, currently tasked with personnel management and oversight responsibilities.

The states under its jurisdiction originated as a distant, militarized frontier during the colonial period, with demographic development beginning around bases and fortifications along the Paraguay and Guaporé rivers. The Arms Government of the province of Mato Grosso, established in 1821, is considered the precursor of the modern Military Region. After the Paraguayan invasion (1864–1868), the province became the third-largest military contingent in the Empire of Brazil. However, in the early decades of the First Brazilian Republic, military service in Mato Grosso was stigmatized; it was a region with poor accessibility and harsh working conditions, often used as a transfer destination for dissenters and "incorrigibles". Military personnel serving there were typically outsiders.

On the other hand, officers in Mato Grosso held significant social, economic, and political influence, often participating in the frequent armed struggles for the state government during Brazil's early republican period. The regional command underwent several reorganizations, becoming the 7th Military District (1891), the 13th Military Region (1908), the Military Circumscription of Mato Grosso (1915), the 1st Military Circumscription (1919), and finally the 9th Military Region (1934). The arrival of the Northwest Brazil Railway in the southern part of the state (which was not yet separated from the northern part) in 1914 improved transportation but did not eliminate the logistical challenges. However, it prompted the transfer of the headquarters to its current location, Campo Grande, in 1919. The southern part of the state then became the primary concentration of troops.

In the 1920s, Mato Grosso was a focal point of tenentist conspiracies, and in the following decade, it became an important theater of operations during the Constitutionalist Revolution of 1932. From 1946 to 1985, the Military Region was subordinated to the Central Military Zone/II Army, based in São Paulo. The brigades and divisions created in Mato Grosso were not subordinated to the 9th Military Region, which currently does not command combat units.

== History ==
=== Early years and control of the rivers ===
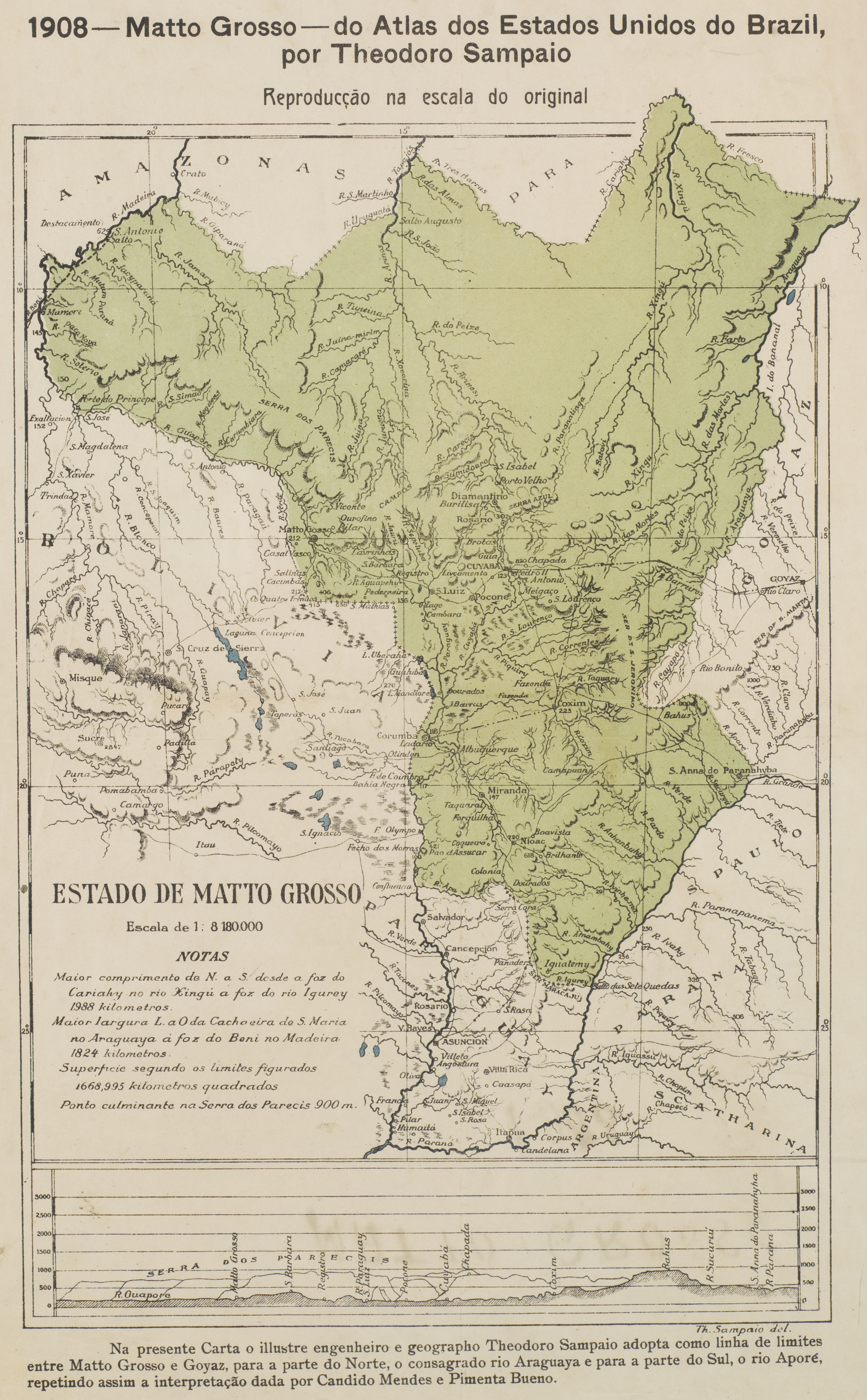
Atlas of the State of Mato Grosso in 1908

The military presence and occupation of the borders have shaped the history of Mato Grosso and Mato Grosso do Sul since the establishment of the Captaincy of Mato Grosso in the mid-18th century. Rivaling the Spanish Empire for dominance over the heart of South America, the Overseas Council of the Portuguese Empire created the captaincy in 1748 to make the "colony of Mato Grosso so powerful so that it imposes respect in its neighbors and serves as a bulwark for the entire interior of Brazil". The first Portuguese governor, Antônio Rolim de Moura, arrived in 1751 with an infantry regiment, officers, artillery pieces, and ammunition. His administration focused on fortifying the border along the Guaporé River, in present-day Mato Grosso and Rondônia, through which the captaincy communicated with the Court. In 1771, captain Luís de Albuquerque de Melo Pereira e Cáceres of the Portuguese Army assumed the governorship. His name is honored in the 9th Military Region with the title "Mello e Cáceres Region".

The territory was vast and sparsely populated. The local economy, centered on mining, was very poor, relying on external supplies of tools, weapons, ammunition, and even food. Internal communications were precarious, and these challenges persisted for many decades.

Navigation to Mato Grosso was facilitated by the Paraguay River, whose outlet to the River Plate was controlled by the Spanish. However, the Spanish advance upstream from Asunción was halted by the construction of Fort Coimbra in 1775. Located at a narrow, easily defensible point, the fort gave the Portuguese control over both banks of the river. Additional fortifications and settlements consolidated Portuguese possession of the right bank. This would become Mato Grosso's first line of defense against an invasion via river. The Miranda Presidio, built in 1797, blocked Spanish progress along the Apa River. The forts, outposts, presidios, and military colonies established along Mato Grosso's borders later became the founding nuclei of many settlements.

=== Paraguayan War ===
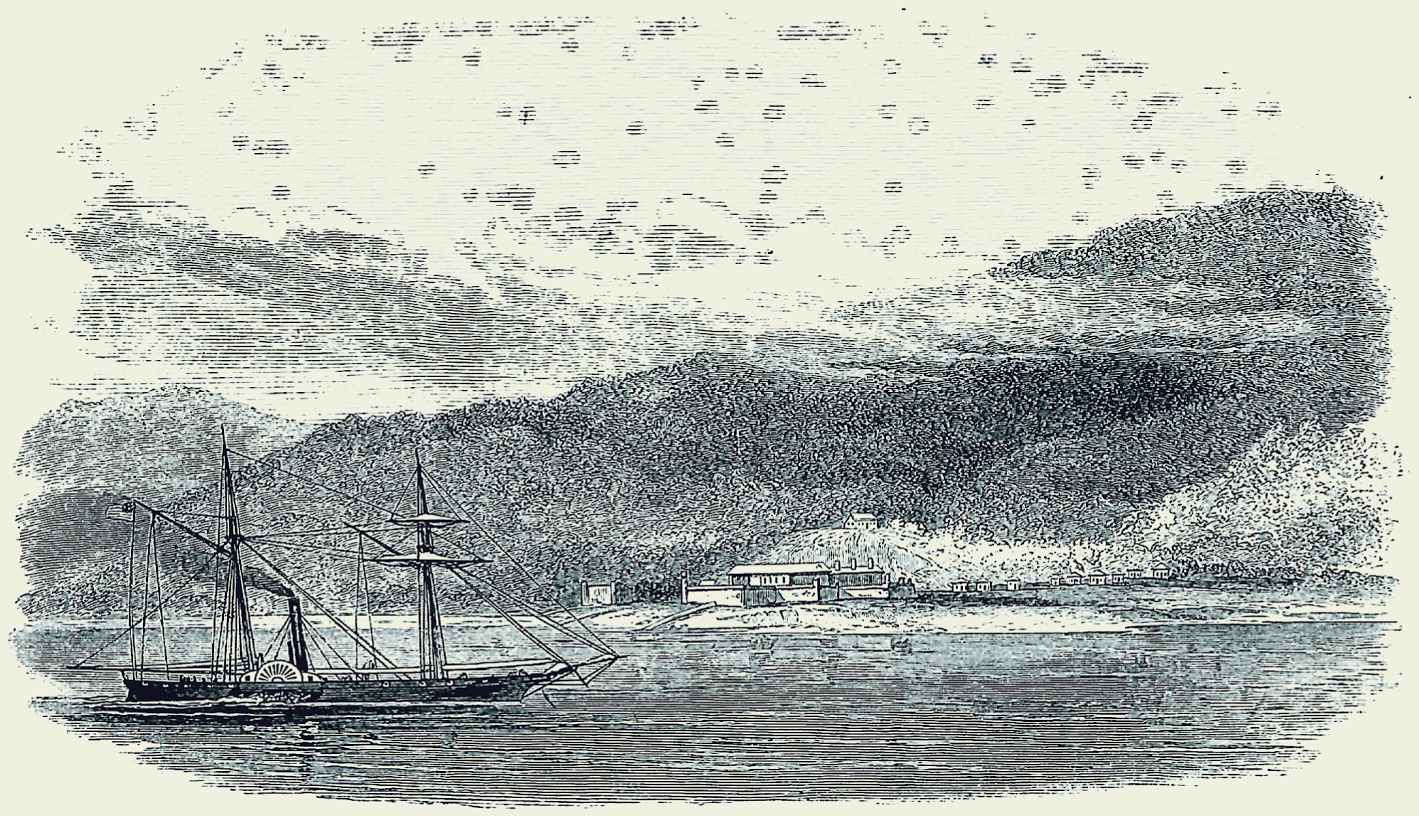
Fort Coimbra on the banks of the Paraguay River

After the independence of South American colonies, Mato Grosso remained strategically important to Brazil as a buffer zone between the country's central provinces (Minas Gerais, São Paulo, and Rio de Janeiro) and the influences of the Platine region (Argentina, Paraguay, and Bolivia). However, by the mid-19th century, the province was one of the weakest in the Empire of Brazil, with a declining economy and population, making it a target for the ambitions of the Republic of Paraguay. In 1863, its defenses comprised only 1,415 regular soldiers (excluding the National Guard), organized into the 2nd Foot Artillery Battalion, Artillery Corps, Cavalry Corps, Hunters Battalion, and Craftsmen Company. Military authority was vested in the Arms Government (later Arms Command) of the province of Mato Grosso, created in 1821 and considered the precursor to the modern Military Region. This institution was subordinated to the provincial president.

Paraguayan troops found it relatively easy to invade Mato Grosso in 1864, initiating the Paraguayan War. The Mato Grosso campaign was fought in the southern part of the province and was marked by the floods of the Pantanal, as well as hunger and disease, which exacted a heavy toll on the troops. Contemporary observers and historians often highlighted the element of surprise and the unpreparedness of Mato Grosso's defenses. However, historian Mário Maestri argued that authorities had been warned in advance, there were considerable stockpiles of arms and ammunition, and the local force could have reached 6,000 troops if the National Guard was mobilized. According to him, the defensive weakness stemmed from the population's unwillingness to volunteer.

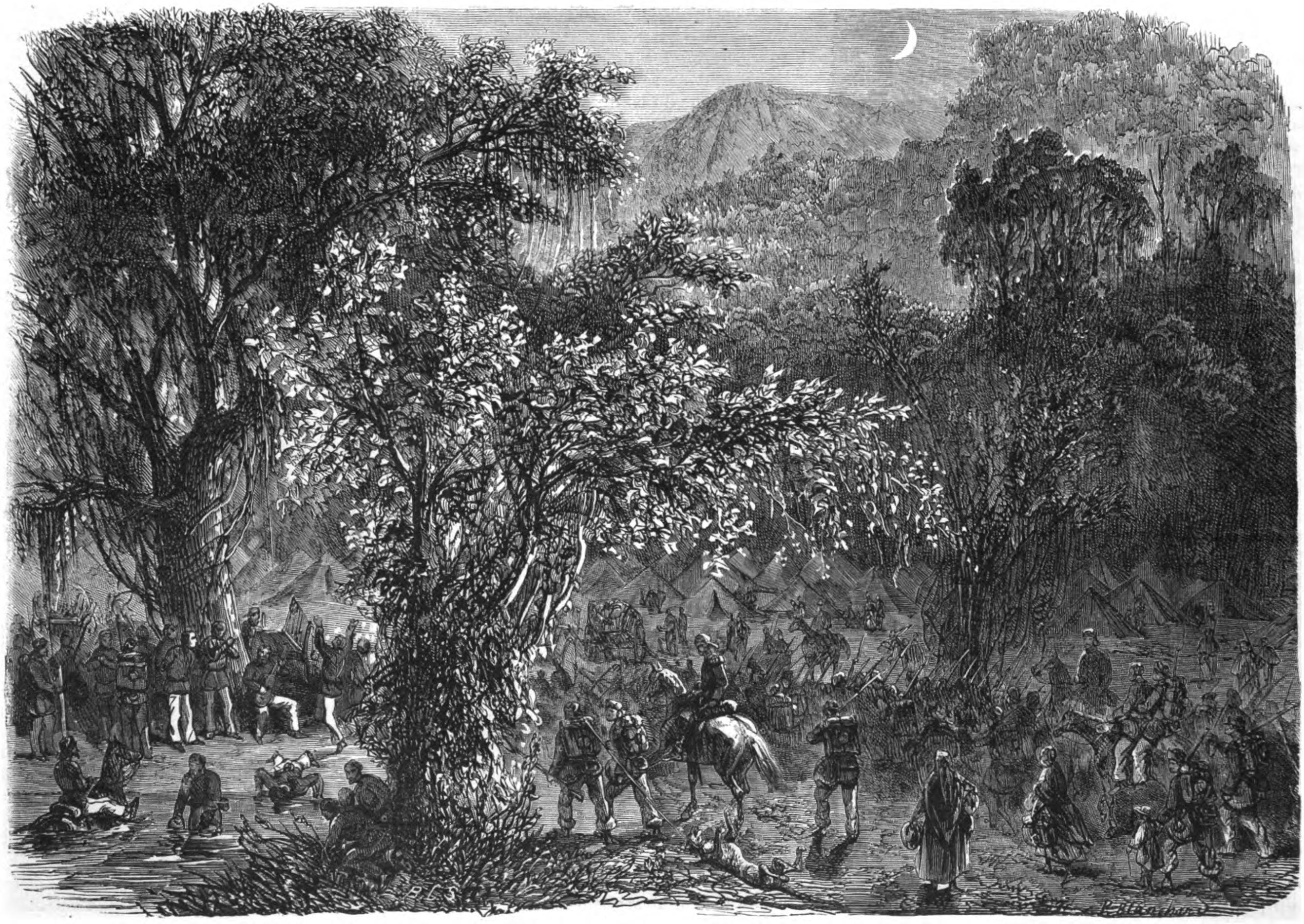
Brazilian expedition to Mato Grosso during the Paraguayan War passing through Goiás

The Paraguayan offensive followed a riverine axis, capturing Fort Coimbra and the towns of Albuquerque and Corumbá, and a land axis targeting the military colonies along the Miranda and Dourados Rivers and the towns of Nioaque, Miranda, and Taquari. Despite fears of a deeper invasion, the Paraguayans never reached the provincial capital, Cuiabá. Reinforcements for the Brazilian forces came from other provinces, such as São Paulo and Minas Gerais. A Brazilian attempt to invade Paraguayan territory led to heavy losses during the Retreat from Laguna. Corumbá was temporarily retaken by Brazilian forces in 1867 and permanently in 1868, as the Paraguayans abandoned their military occupation of Mato Grosso. This withdrawal was prompted by their setbacks on another front of the war, Humaitá, which opened Paraguayan territory to invasion by the Triple Alliance.

The Mato Grosso campaign was a secondary theater of the war but had a profound impact on the local history. In the following century, battles and figures such as Carlos Camisão, Guia Lopes, and Antônio João were commemorated in monuments, street names, and public buildings, and the campaign was promoted as a cornerstone of Mato Grosso do Sul's identity. After 1870, the Paraguay River was fully opened to international navigation, attracting settlers and investments to the southern part of the province, though the region also saw an increase in foreign bandit activity and land disputes. Fearing Paraguay and Argentina, the Empire of Brazil reinforced military presence in Mato Grosso, with troop numbers fluctuating between 1,237 and 2,481 men between 1871 and 1888. By 1889, the year of the Proclamation of the Republic, Mato Grosso had the third-largest army contingent among Brazilian provinces, representing 5% of the total. Garrisons were stationed in Cuiabá, Cáceres, Nioaque, and Corumbá, also contributing to the occupation of Paraguay, which lasted until 1876.

Beyond international concerns, the army also fought against indigenous raids around Cuiabá and in the Mato Grosso backlands. These operations, combined with the need to protect the Paraguay and Guaporé Rivers with limited resources, scattered the forces across garrisons ranging from 1 to 64 soldiers. By 1884, approximately 25% of the troops served far from their unit headquarters, guarding fortresses, depots, riverbanks, and military colonies. This dispersion hindered both administrative routines and training efforts.

=== First Brazilian Republic and Military District ===
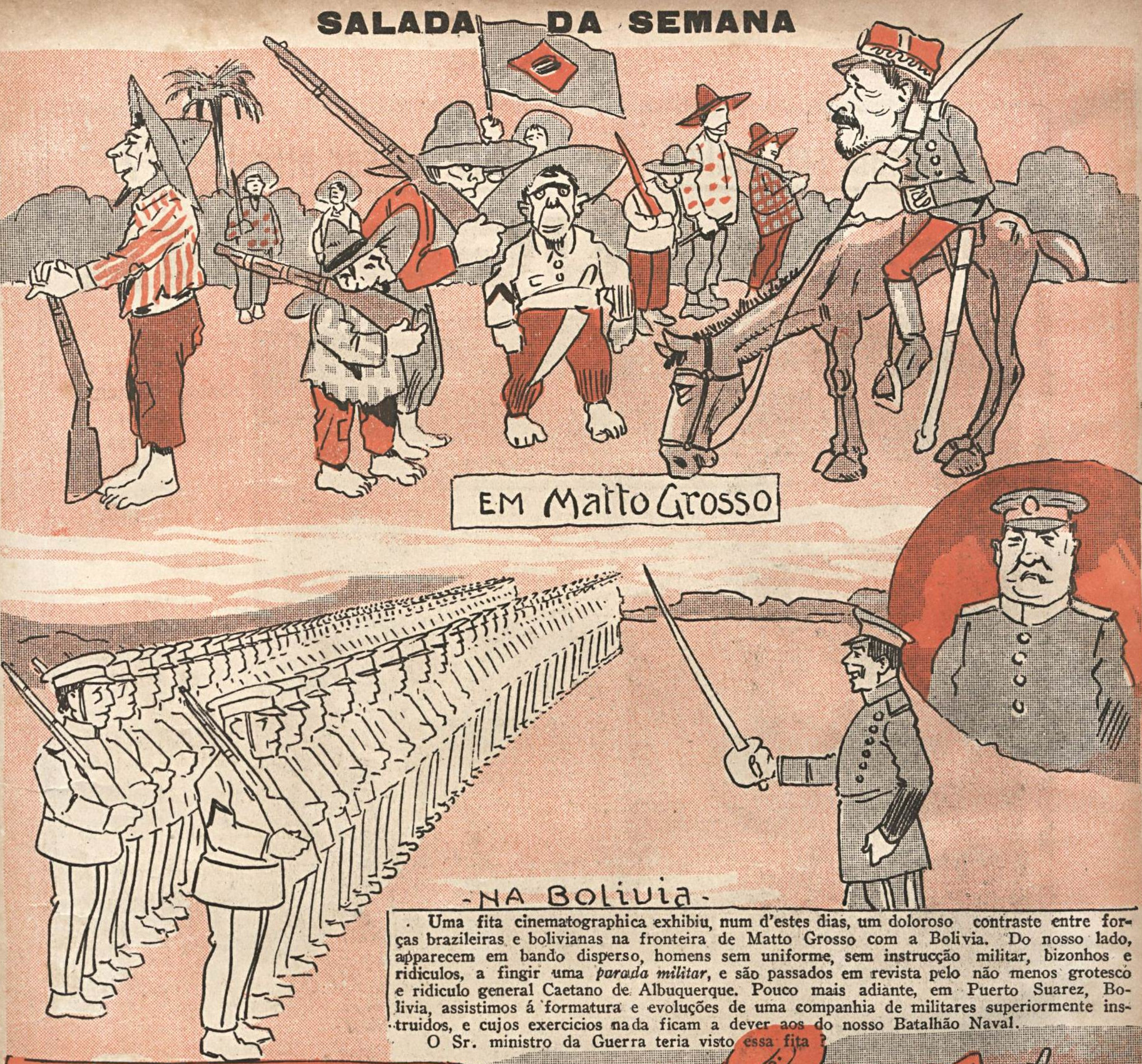
The magazine O Malho unfavorably comparing the Brazilian soldiers in Mato Grosso with the Bolivian Army: "men without uniforms, without military training, ignorant and ridiculous"

The Proclamation of the Republic was met in Mato Grosso with a small monarchist revolt by enlisted soldiers at the detachment on the Apa River's mouth on 20 December 1889. In 1891, the Arms Commands were replaced by Military Districts, subordinated to the Ministry of War, which would form major operational units in wartime. The 6th and 7th Districts, corresponding respectively to Rio Grande do Sul and Mato Grosso, were the only ones covering a single state due to their strategic importance. The district headquarters was in Cuiabá, and the units remained stationed along the rivers of the Paraná Basin. Transportation, whether by river or animal traction, was challenging, especially during droughts. Telegraphic communication with the rest of the country, a geostrategic military necessity, began only in 1891 when Cuiabá was connected to the Goiás border.

Mato Grosso was a demographic void, and most of the military personnel stationed there were from other states. The journey was long, food and accommodations were poor, and diseases ravaged both enlisted men and officers. The region carried the stigmas of being backward, violent, and uncivilized, being described by Euclides da Cunha as the army's "canicular Siberia." Transfer to Mato Grosso was considered a punishment and a career setback. Since the Imperial period, political dissenters were informally transferred there as punishment, contributing to frequent local revolts. In 1907, general Dantas Barreto criticized the "system adopted by all Republican governments of filling the ranks of the federal force there with incorrigible personnel from other garrisons". Officers did everything they could to avoid serving there, and many men, thanks to their connections, never reported for duty.

Between 1860 and 1907, the typical infantry soldier (representing more than half of those recorded in the Record Books) in Mato Grosso was from another state (especially from Northeastern Brazil), of mixed race, standing between 1.60 and 1.69 meters tall, aged 18 to 25, single, without a trade, and illiterate. Recruits from outside the state were often forcibly conscripted (known as the "blood tax") as a way for authorities to rid themselves of certain groups, such as capoeiras from Rio de Janeiro. Others, like refugees from the Northeast's droughts, volunteered for the army as a means of survival. However, in Mato Grosso, soldiers commonly experienced delays of over twelve months in their pay. Relations between enlisted men and officers were often marked by paternalism or, until the 1910s, by crime and disobedience. Criminality was not exclusive to the army, as banditry was endemic in the region. Desertion, on the other hand, was uncommon due to the predominance of non-local recruits.

The combat strength of the district was set at 2,009 men between 1890 and 1907, distributed among the 2nd Fixed Artillery Battalion, the 7th Cavalry Regiment, and the 8th, 19th, and 21st Infantry Battalions. These were the same units from the late Brazilian Empire; only the Cavalry Regiment had its name changed. Although the local population was growing, actual troop strength tended to decline, falling from 1,570 at the beginning of the period to 625 in 1900, before recovering to 1,368 later.

=== Local political ambitions ===
Serving in Mato Grosso, on the other hand, offered an opportunity to shape local history. Military personnel embodied the presence of the state in the most isolated regions through public works, mapping, border delineation, and the exploration and settlement of unknown lands. Their presence had significant social and political importance, as military spending played a crucial role in the local economy, and the proportion of soldiers in the population was higher than in other states.

The police forces of Mato Grosso were not strong enough to rival the army, unlike the "state armies" in stronger states. In states like Minas Gerais and São Paulo, military officers were largely excluded from partisan politics. However, in Mato Grosso—a politically minor state dependent on the federal government—officers had a long history of holding public office. Their social status and prestige were comparable to those of officers in Rio Grande do Sul, where they engaged in local political disputes through alliances and family ties. The local government was led by military personnel for much of the Brazilian Empire and on five occasions during the Republic.

In the early years of the Republic, local military personnel were deeply involved in coronelistic disputes for control of the state government. Mato Grosso entered what has been termed a "revolutionary cycle", with successive outbreaks of armed violence. By 1916, the state had witnessed at least four major revolts. Historian Valmir Corrêa identified 33 armed political conflicts—not necessarily on a state-wide scale—between 1891 and 1922, as well as 26 armed actions by bandits and gangs related to political disputes, cattle rustling, and other crimes between 1872 and 1943. The southern region saw the highest concentration of conflicts. Military personnel frequently took sides in these disputes, diverted ammunition, and undermined the command chain.

The first major revolt occurred in 1892, within the national context of disputes between the military and local oligarchies following the November 3 Coup. The military supported general and former governor Antônio Maria Coelho, the first republican leader of the state. The officer corps of the 7th Military District (and part of the Brazilian Navy) mobilized all military units, marched on Cuiabá, and seized the government. However, within the army, some supported the opposing side, led by Generoso Ponce. The federal government appointed general Luiz Henrique de Oliveira Ewbank to govern the state and command the Military District, but the local military, breaking the command chain, blocked him from advancing beyond Fort Coimbra. Some radicals even proposed the establishment of the Transatlantic Republic of Mato Grosso. This movement was ultimately defeated by a militia assembled by Generoso Ponce.

Military interventions in local politics diminished in intensity in the following years, but the military continued to play a role during crises. In 1899, the militia of Antônio Pais de Barros occupied Cuiabá and prevented the Legislative Assembly from ratifying election results. Under orders from the federal government, which favored the opposition, the Military District remained neutral. In 1906, the local garrison broadly supported Generoso Ponce's revolt against the government of Pais de Barros, even though the governor had federal support. The federal government dispatched general Dantas Barreto with reinforcements, but by the time he reached Cuiabá, the revolt had succeeded, and the governor had been executed.

=== The railway and telegraph ===
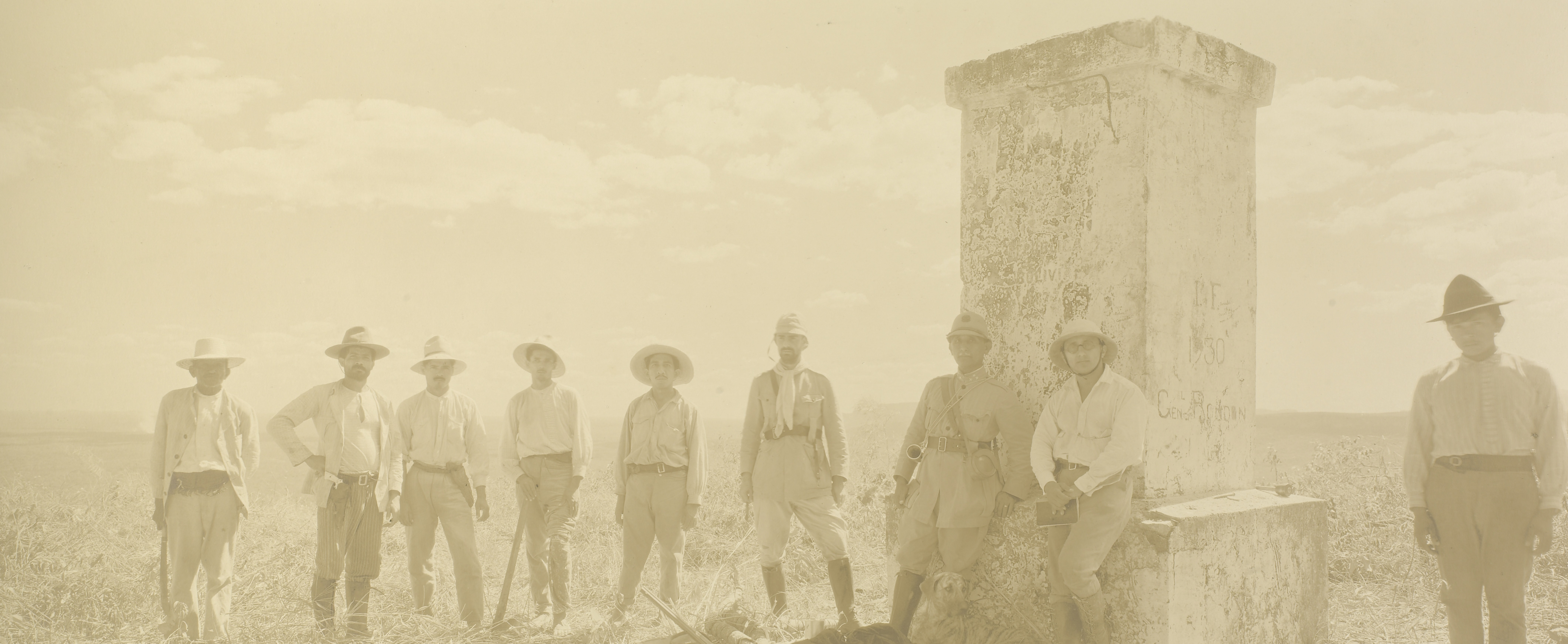
Rondon at a border marker with Bolivia

In 1904, construction began on the Northwest Brazil Railway (NOB), connecting Mato Grosso to São Paulo. More than an economic venture, this project was strategic and had been debated since the 1870s, when the importance of railways for military mobilization in Europe and the difficulty of defending Mato Grosso were recognized. It was essential to shorten the travel time for reinforcements from the coast to Mato Grosso and reduce dependence on the Paraguay River, which could be blockaded by Argentina or Paraguay during hostilities. The Acre War (1899–1903), during which reinforcements from Rio Grande do Sul were sent to Corumbá (as the local garrison was deemed unreliable), confirmed to Republican authorities the need to end the region's isolation.

In addition to the railway, telegraphic communication was also essential to reach the country's "unknown" vastness. This was part of the Brazil's state-building project and, as such, involved the Ministries of War and Industry, Transport, and Public Works. Between 1900 and 1915, two commissions led by colonel Cândido Rondon extended telegraph lines to the western border and the Madeira River. Clearing the dense forest for the telegraph lines required grueling treks by soldiers, often barefoot and hungry, a hardship that military authorities utilized. From 1910 or earlier, they began transferring undisciplined soldiers to the 5th Engineering Battalion, commanded by Rondon, to work on the telegraph lines.

=== Hermes Reform ===
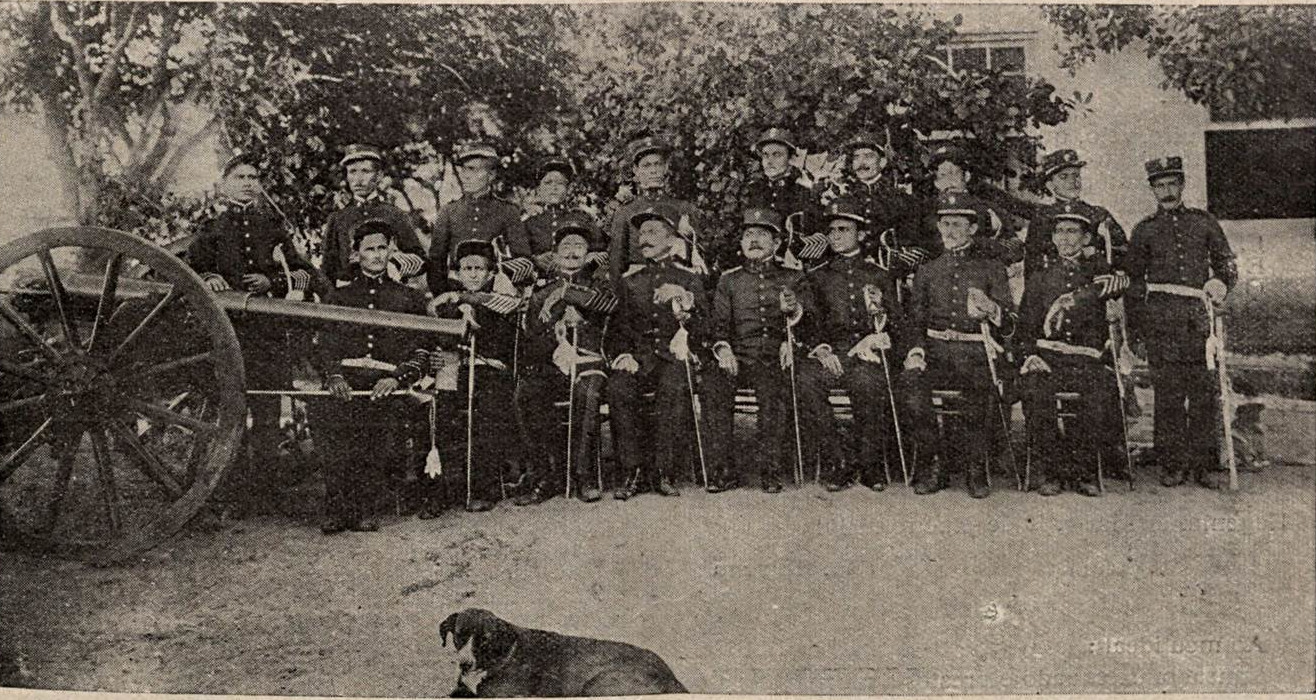
Officers of the 5th Horse Artillery Regiment, 1913

In 1908, during Hermes da Fonseca's tenure as Minister of War, the Brazilian Army initiated the first of its comprehensive reforms during the First Republic, with two complementary measures: mandatory military service, introduced by the Sortition Law, would provide the personnel needed to complete a new order of battle. In Mato Grosso, this reform transformed the 7th Military District into the 13th Military Region. Its commander, designated as the permanent inspector, would also assume leadership of a new operational body, the 5th Strategic Brigade. From 1910 onward, the command was intended to be held by a division general.

The planned troop strength increased to 3,580 men, to be supplemented by conscription. Preferably, recruits would come from the jurisdiction of the Military Region to reduce transportation costs. The military's center of gravity shifted to the southern part of the state, where the railway would pass and conflict was more likely. Units were stationed in Bela Vista and Ponta Porã, on the border with Paraguay, a country closely tied to Argentina, which was considered the likely enemy. The brigade was to be headquartered in the south-central region, either in Aquidauana or Campo Grande, commanding three infantry regiments, one cavalry regiment, and one artillery regiment. The Military Region's headquarters remained in Corumbá, the main commercial center along the Paraguay River.

Predicted organization in 1908
13th Military Region, Corumbá
- 5th Strategic Brigade, Aquidauana
  - 13th Infantry Regiment, Corumbá
    - 37th Infantry Battalion
    - 38th Infantry Battalion
    - 39th Infantry Battalion
  - 14th Infantry Regiment, Aquidauana
    - 40th Infantry Battalion
    - 41th Infantry Battalion
    - 42th Infantry Battalion
  - 15th Infantry Regiment, Nioaque (yet to organize)
  - 17th Cavalry Regiment, Ponta Porã (yet to organize)
  - 5th Horse Artillery Regiment, Aquidauana
  - 5th Engineering Battalion, Cáceres
  - 5th Artillery Park, Aquidauana
  - 5th Machine Gun Company, Aquidauana
  - 5th Howitzer Battery, Aquidauana
  - 5th Train Squadron, Aquidauana
  - 5th Messenger Platoon, Aquidauana
- 3rd Artillery Battalion, Corumbá
- 3rd Cavalry Regiment, Bela Vista
- 13th Hunters Company, Cuiabá

The actual troop strength was just over half of the planned number, and the new military conscription system would take several more years to be implemented. Recruits incorporated in Mato Grosso during this period were still enlisted under the old system. The army's bureaucracy had limited reach, and the coronelism system made it difficult to access potential recruits from rural areas, meaning that most recruits came from urban centers, especially Corumbá. Rural "warlords" had their own recruitment capabilities, using them to form militias for local conflicts.

The 5th Brigade command never materialized, and the conditions in the barracks were very precarious. Regiments were supposed to have three battalions each, but the 14th Regiment (formed by incorporating personnel from the former 8th Battalion) had only two battalions in 1910, housed in a rented building. The 15th Regiment, also organized with two battalions, had only a few dozen soldiers by 1911. The 13th Regiment was in slightly better condition.

=== Campo Grande ===
The trains of the Northwest Brazil Railway began operating in 1914, integrating the region into the sphere of influence of São Paulo. While there was still no bridge over the Paraná River at the São Paulo border, the tracks extended from Bauru, in São Paulo, to Porto Esperança, south of Corumbá. In the event of a war, reinforcements could arrive much more quickly, but dependence on carts and cargo boats persisted, as branch lines had yet to be constructed. Waves of workers migrated to the region, and commerce shifted to Campo Grande, located on the railway, to the detriment of the fluvial route through Corumbá.

A new army order of battle, implemented in 1915–1916, reduced the planned troop strength in Mato Grosso and eliminated or transferred the 5th Strategic Brigade along with several units. The 13th Military Region was reorganized into the Military Circumscription of Mato Grosso (CMMT), subordinated to the 6th Military Region (later the 2nd), based in São Paulo. The military status of the regional command was downgraded to that of a brigade. The structure no longer adhered to state boundaries; in Mato Grosso, there were units subordinated to the 2nd Division, in Niterói, and the 4th Division, in São Paulo.

The Mixed Brigade's organization in 1921
Mixed Brigade Command, Campo Grande
- 16th Hunters Battalion, Cuiabá
- 17th Hunters Battalion, Corumbá
- 18th Hunters Battalion, Campo Grande
- 10th Independent Cavalry Regiment, Bela Vista
- 11th Independent Cavalry Regiment, Ponta Porã
- Mixed Artillery Regiment, Campo Grande
- 5th Coastal Artillery Group, Coimbra
- 6th Engineering Battalion, Aquidauana
- Mixed Aviation Squadron, Campo Grande
- Porto Murtinho and Ponta Porã detachments

Conscription was finally implemented in 1916. However, the effects of military drafts in Mato Grosso were limited in their early years due to widespread fraud and mass evasion. It was only in the following decade that conscription began to function relatively regularly. During this period, due to transportation difficulties, conscripts from some northern municipalities in the state were sent to Manaus and from there to Rio de Janeiro and Mato Grosso. A significant number of conscripts were outsiders—Goiás natives and, especially, western São Paulo natives.

Further reorganizations took place in 1919 and 1921. In the latter, Mato Grosso was assigned the country's only Mixed Brigade. The brigade and the Circunscription (officially the 1st Military Circumscription, though still referred to as the Military Circumscription of Mato Grosso in the press) shared the same commander. With its ranks fully staffed, the CMMT would consist of more than 3,269 officers and soldiers. The subordination to São Paulo was eliminated, and the regional command regained its independence. This reorganization was accompanied by a national program of barracks construction under the leadership of War Minister Pandiá Calógeras. A notable example is the barracks of the 1st Horse Artillery Regiment, in Campo Grande, with a frontage exceeding 126 meters in length.

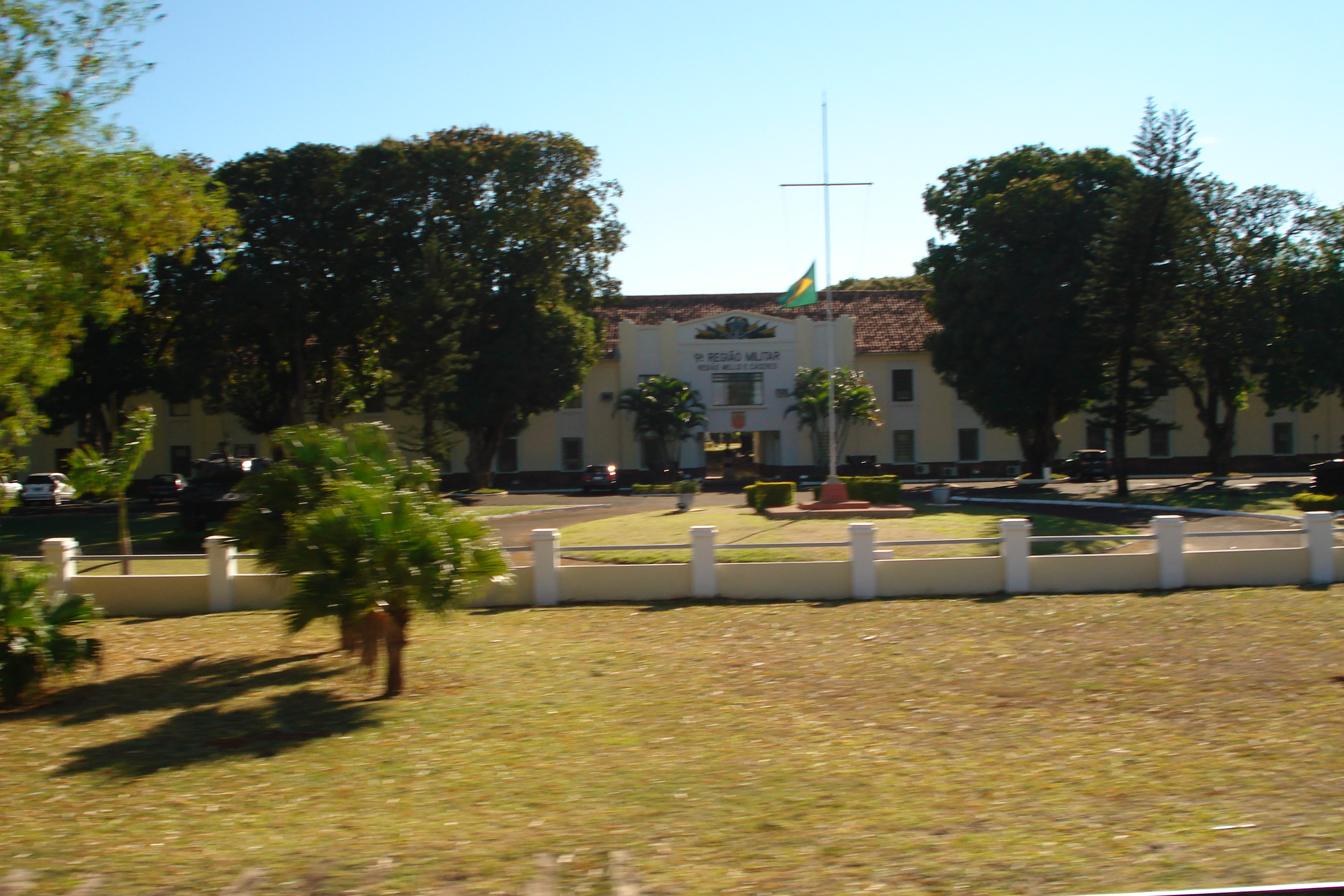
Barracks of the Military Region in Campo Grande

The headquarters of the Military Circumscription was moved to Campo Grande in 1919, a city described by the Ministry of War as the "natural zone for troop concentration". It was a logistical hub with the potential to become the starting point for new railway branches. Its location was not immediately on the border, aligning with the army's new defensive doctrine: in the event of an invasion, resources for a counteroffensive would be concentrated via railway in the rear. Another favorable factor was the mild local climate.

The status of Campo Grande as the "military capital of the state" had long-term consequences. The city was experiencing rapid development, and the military became actively involved in its socioeconomic, political, and cultural life. In 1939, as noted by an observer: "Campo Grande is already an important city, a convergence point for several nearby municipalities"; "uniformed personnel stand out among the civilian population", and "a respectable sum of money is injected monthly into the local economy". Furthermore, "the mere fact that the Military Region's headquarters remains in Campo Grande gives its inhabitants a sense of entitlement that they believe other parts of the state do not share". Local elites appreciated the order guaranteed by the army but, on the other hand, "not all military leaders have managed to maintain a neutral position in local political disputes".

=== Tenentism ===
The golden age of armed conflicts between local oligarchs came to an end with a federal intervention in 1917; in February, the headquarters of the Military Circumscription of Mato Grosso (CMMT) was temporarily moved to Cuiabá to support the federal intervener, returning to Corumbá in December. However, military revolts persisted. Historian Valmir Corrêa identified eleven "revolutionary manifestations of the military forces" between 1912 and 1932. In May 1912, captain Antonio Netto de Azambuja led a mutiny within part of the 17th Cavalry Regiment, allegedly in support of colonel Bento Xavier's insurgency. Twice, in December 1912 and March 1919, infantry soldiers in Corumbá revolted over delayed pay. In January 1921, lieutenant Heitor Mendes Gonçalves led the federal detachment in Ponta Porã against the local Public Force. This movement, described in the Paraguayan press as a local "coup d'état", echoed the ideals of tenentism. According to the lieutenant, he opposed "political abuses and the practice of electoral fraud by the ruling oligarchies". His actions also appeared to favor the Matte Larangeira Company.

Just as the influence of warring oligarchs began to decline gradually, the radicalization of middle-ranking army officers led to new revolts. In 1922, Mato Grosso's officer corps, including two generals (Joaquim Ignácio Cardoso and Clodoaldo da Fonseca), overwhelmingly supported the first tenentist revolt, which began in Rio de Janeiro in July. Although tenentism was a national movement rather than a Mato Grosso-specific one, local factors such as poor working conditions and punitive transfers to the region contributed to its momentum. The Mato Grosso garrison was one of the few to participate significantly in the revolt, though it surrendered without combat. The conflict demonstrated the consolidation of the nation-state in southern Mato Grosso: the rebels called up reservists and looted revenue and currency issuance offices. The new physical infrastructure—telegraph lines and railroads—was used to transmit orders and move troops. Rebels and loyalists faced off near Três Lagoas, a critical point on the railway where the Paraná River was crossed into São Paulo.

After their defeat in this initial phase, Mato Grosso became a center of conspiracy. Some of the rebels escaped imprisonment, seeking refuge in neighboring countries. The Military Circumscription of Mato Grosso (CMMT) was left short of many officers, and those remaining were sympathetic to tenentisst movement. The plans that culminated in the second tenentist revolt, which began in São Paulo in July 1924, included isolated support in southern Mato Grosso. Intermittent and unsuccessful uprisings continued until 1925, the first of which occurred at the 10th Independent Cavalry Regiment on 12 July. The command of the CMMT, now under general João Nepomuceno da Costa, had shifted to a loyalist stance. Promises of civilian support for the tenentists were unfulfilled; since the "fusion" of rival political factions in 1921, party leaders had been content with the division of public offices and favors.

Mobilization was too slow. The CMMT failed to fulfill its role in the planned encirclement maneuver against the rebels in the São Paulo capital, and the rebels occupied Bauru, on the way to Mato Grosso, long before the Mato Grosso forces could arrive. The rebels aimed to capture Mato Grosso and prolong the campaign, intending to establish the state of "Brasilândia". According to João Cabanas, this territory would be easy to defend using Fort Coimbra and the Paraná River. However, reinforcements from Minas Gerais, led by colonel Malan d'Angrogne, defeated the incursion into Mato Grosso at the Battle of Três Lagoas, forcing the rebels to move south and embark on the Paraná Campaign.

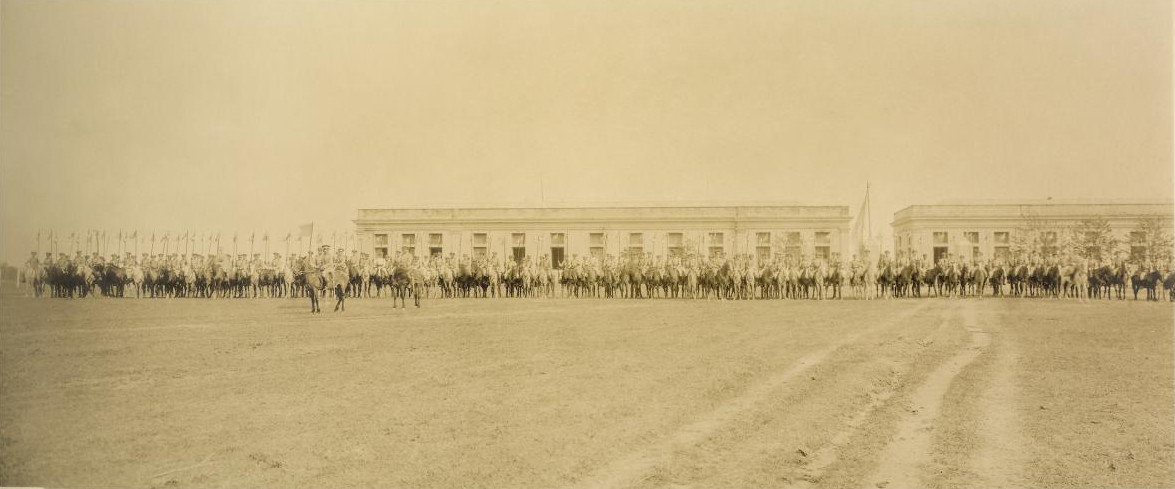
10th Independent Cavalry Regiment in 1929-1930

Several additional battles were fought in Mato Grosso territory. Although the loyalists failed to prevent the rebel advance into Paraná, they delayed their passage and forced the surrender of the 7th Battalion of the revolutionary forces. On 20 October, Nepomuceno da Costa handed over command of the CMMT to Malan d'Angrogne, declaring victory in the defense of Mato Grosso. In February and March of the following year, tenentists in the 6th Engineering Battalion and the 17th Hunters Battalion launched brief revolts. In April, another tenentista formation, the Prestes Column, entered Mato Grosso from Paraguay, having come from Paraná. The rebels occupied Ponta Porã but found only limited support among the officer corps. Colonel Bertoldo Klinger organized new loyalist defenses. The rebels decided to avoid the loyalist concentrations in Campo Grande and Entre Rios, continuing instead toward Goiás. They would return in 1926–1927, but only to traverse the state on their way to exile.

The tenentist campaigns in Mato Grosso, starting in 1924, attracted attention in the press, even under a state of emergency. The army's image in the region suffered, as conscription failed to provide adequate mobilization, and the government continued to rely on the "patriotic battalions" of the local oligarchs. Materiel shortages and a deficit of officers and troops persisted throughout the decade. On the other hand, the campaigns drew federal investments, and the CMMT received its first military trucks; until then, it had depended on the requisitioning of private vehicles.

=== The revolutions of 1930 and 1932 ===
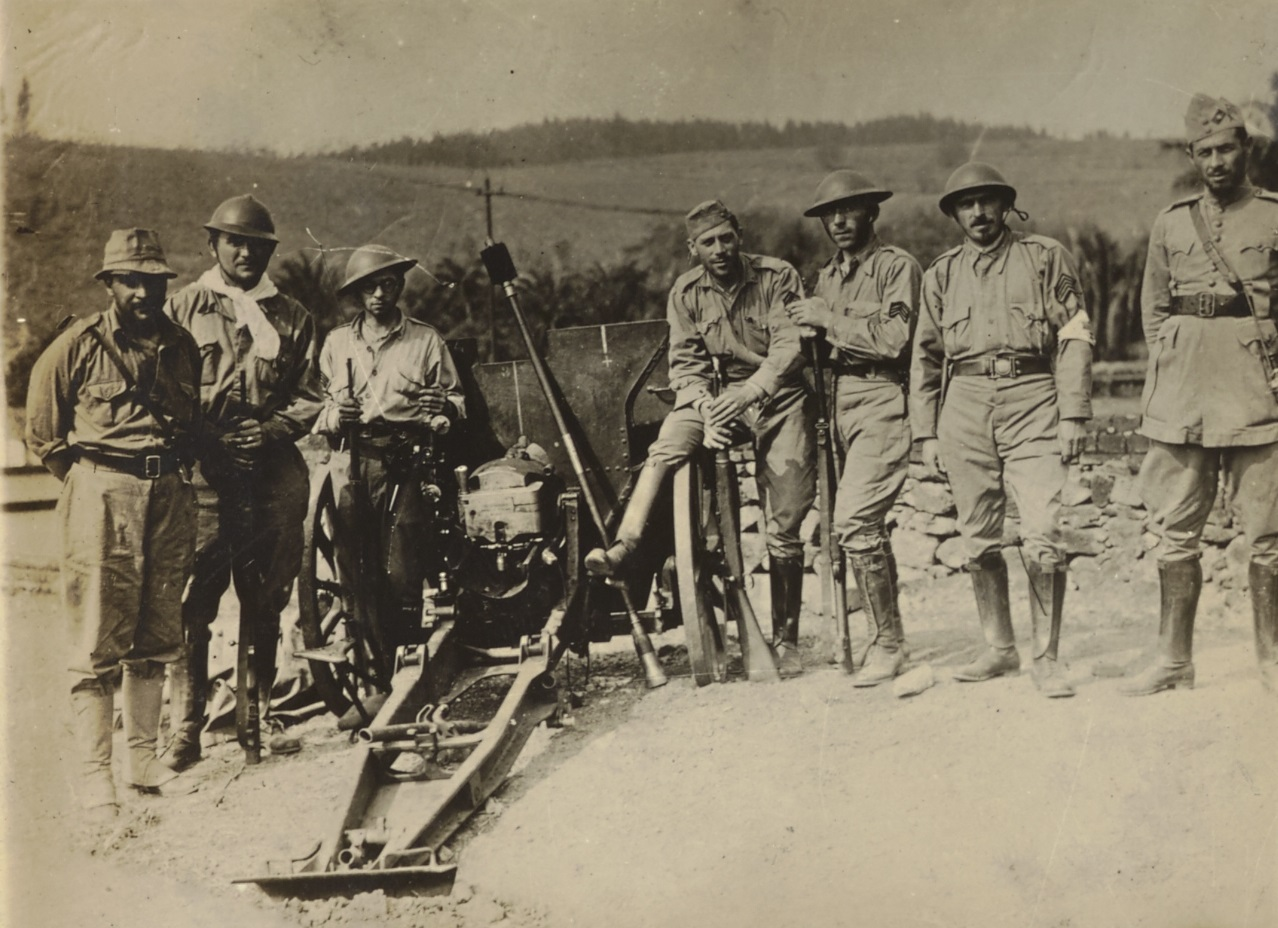
Campo Grande Artillery in the São Paulo countryside in 1932

During the Revolution of 1930, the First Republic was overthrown in Rio de Janeiro while a conspiracy was still being organized among cavalry units along the Paraguayan border. Colonel Antonino Mena Gonçalves, the organizer of the conspiracy, was one of the first interveners appointed by the Provisional Government of Getúlio Vargas to govern Mato Grosso. Shortly after his departure in 1931, general Bertoldo Klinger was transferred to the command of the CMMT due to his disagreements with the former tenentists, who were now in power. Klinger encountered a force of about 1,200 men, with a deficit of 1,235 troops. For transportation, there were 604 horses and cattle, 21 trucks, and four automobiles. This period saw significant activity, described as a "rare professionalizing interlude", highlighted by field maneuvers in Nioaque; until then, annual maneuvers had been conducted as mere formalities.

Indiscipline among the enlisted ranks was severe. Between May and November 1931, numerous soldiers from the Northeast, where several revolts among enlisted personnel had occurred, were transferred to Mato Grosso. In March 1932, some sergeants transferred from the 21st Hunters Battalion in Recife led another rebellion in the 18th Hunters Battalion in Corumbá. No officers participated in the movement, which had connections with sergeants in other states. Defeated at the headquarters, the rebels fled to the far south, into the lands of Matte Larangeira. The pursuing forces became involved in a land dispute in the region, supporting the police in suppressing João Ortt's squatters.

Klinger joined the Constitutionalist Revolution of 1932 against Getúlio Vargas, bringing with him the majority of the garrisons. The 16th and 17th Hunters Battalions, from Cuiabá and Corumbá, the 5th Coastal Artillery Group from Coimbra, and the Special Detachment in Cáceres remained loyal to the Provisional Government. The constitutionalists controlled the region on the border with São Paulo and the tracks of the Northwest Brazil Railway. The conflict in Mato Grosso took on the nature of an internal civil war, fought largely by local troops and militias. While this theater of operations was secondary, it was nonetheless significant because the Paraná River was the only route connecting the constitutionalists in São Paulo to the outside world. According to historian Virgílio Corrêa Filho, the Constitutionalist Revolution was practically finished in Mato Grosso. With the defeat of the constitutionalists, the rebellious units were dissolved and reconstituted with troops transferred from units loyal to the Provisional Government.

=== Repercussions of the Chaco War ===
The 1932 civil war marked the end of a period of turbulence among the military in Mato Grosso. Subsequent conflicts did not seriously threaten the integrity of military units or the defense of the territory. In 1934, the circumscription received its current designation as the 9th Military Region. The army could not neglect the region, which neighbored the Chaco War operations fought between Bolivia and Paraguay from 1932 to 1935. The Army General Staff became alarmed by the expansion of Paraguay's military force, which grew to 70,000 men. The government sought to reinforce the Mato Grosso Flotilla and sent a commission led by the Inspector of Coastal Artillery, general José Pessoa, to examine Fort Coimbra.

The commission found the fort's defenses to be obsolete and ineffective and made recommendations, including the observation that an effective blockade of the Paraguay River would require defenses further south, at the confluence with the Apa River, forming a mobile system with minefields, infantry, and field artillery. The fort itself was deemed more vulnerable to a land-based attack during the dry season than to a water-based attack during floods. In a war with Paraguay or Bolivia, other major concerns included defending the Northwest Brazil Railway, Corumbá, and the nearby naval base at Ladário. The commission also highlighted Corumbá's proximity to the Bolivian border, the lack of natural obstacles, and the large number of Bolivian and Paraguayan residents.

After the Communist Uprising of 1935, several military personnel in Mato Grosso's garrisons were investigated for connections to the National Liberation Alliance (ANL). Communists operating in Mato Grosso followed the local tradition of revolts, seeking alliances with traditional political leaders such as Godofredo Gonçalves and the bandit Silvino Jacques, a 1932 veteran who led ex-military men and Paraguayan deserters. Jacques was interested in dividing the state of Mato Grosso but severed ties upon discovering the uprising's communist nature.

=== Estado Novo ===
José Pessoa, facing ostracism in the federal capital, assumed command of the 9th Military Region in August 1938, holding the position for seven months. During this brief period, he visited even the smallest garrisons. He drew his superiors' attention to the deficiencies in transportation, requesting aviation resources and Road Battalions. At the time, Mato Grosso had the 4th Road Battalion, which was directly subordinate to the Engineering Directorate. According to his aide-de-camp, Nelson Werneck Sodré, "without boats and airplanes, it was impossible to command that Military Region, with troops dispersed across vast territory, hundreds of kilometers from the headquarters, which also lacked resources". Collaborating with the civil administration, Pessoa established schools in remote regions where Portuguese was scarcely known, gaining attention from the press in Rio de Janeiro and São Paulo.

His main concern was combating banditry, which had reached its peak in the region, taking advantage of the borders and protection from local power brokers who refused to return the weapons distributed in 1932 to fight the constitutionalists. A major campaign was launched against the gang of Silvino Jacques, who specialized in cattle theft. Using his intimate knowledge of the terrain, Jacques repeatedly evaded pursuing forces. The general also sought to disarm the civilian population but failed to achieve the desired effect. Controversially, he ordered the arrest of oligarchs who possessed army-issued weapons.

The disarmament and suppression of banditry aligned with the Estado Novo policies, which aimed to impose state authority over the oligarchs. However, Pessoa and Sodré reported indifference from War Minister Eurico Gaspar Dutra; the Military Region did not receive the requested resources, and in December, Dutra ordered the cessation of pursuit operations, arguing that they distracted troops from regular training. Jacques would later be killed by a local militia. Despite limitations, military pressure weakened banditry in the region. Pessoa was dismissed in March 1939. Sodré speculated that he may have upset the region's powerful elite; alternatively, it is possible that Getúlio Vargas wanted him closer to his sphere of influence.

The Military Region participated in World War II through the 9th Engineering Battalion, based in Aquidauana, which was transferred to the Brazilian Expeditionary Force (FEB), along with many soldiers from other units. A significant number of these soldiers were São Paulo natives who volunteered to escape the harsh conditions of the region's remote garrisons.

=== New commands in Mato Grosso ===
The 9th Military Region was subordinated to the Central Military Zone, later known as the II Army, in 1946. In the same year, the Mixed Brigade was renamed the 2nd Mixed Brigade, but despite the name, it was merely a grouping of territorial and border forces without the support units necessary for independent operations. In 1949, cavalry units on the Paraguayan border were consolidated into the 4th Cavalry Division (DC). By 1960, the 2nd Mixed Brigade and the 4th DC, rather than the Military Region, were in command of the troops, with both these commands and the Military Region reporting to the II Army in São Paulo.

Under the military apparatus of president João Goulart (1961–1964), many dissident officers were transferred to Mato Grosso. Due to communication difficulties, these officers were not always in sync with other dissatisfaction hubs but became the majority in the region. The commander of the Military Region, general Barbosa Lima, joined the 1964 coup d’état against Goulart shortly after his superior, general Amaury Kruel, did. The 16th Hunters Battalion moved from Cuiabá to Brasília, and shortly after the coup, the 9th Military Region oversaw the arrests of political opponents.

In 1980, the command of the 9th Military Region was combined with the newly established 9th Army Division (9th RM/DE), which was responsible for the three brigades in the area at the time. After the creation of the Western Military Command (CMO) in 1985, another consolidation occurred, and the highest authority became the CMO/9th RM/DE commander. However, this arrangement lasted only until 1989, when the Military Region regained its autonomy, though it remained subordinated to the CMO. The Region transitioned into a purely administrative command, with responsibilities for logistics, mobilization, territory management, and military service. Additional responsibilities were transferred in 2016 to the newly created 9th Logistics Group and 3rd Engineering Group.

Currently, the 9th Military Region (9th RM) describes its responsibilities as "the core processes of Controlled Products Oversight, under the guidance of the Logistics Command, and Human Resources Assistance Management (Military Service, Veterans and Pensioners, Health), under the technical supervision of the General Department of Personnel". It directly oversees the Military Hospital of Campo Grande and four Tiros de Guerra (Military Training Centers). The Military School of Campo Grande is also affiliated with the 9th RM.

In the 21st century, the borders of both states under the 9th RM/Western Military Command (CMO) continue to have low population density, but they are now better connected to the rest of the country. The region's proximity to the central power in Brasília and its status as one of Brazil's primary entry routes for drug trafficking have shaped its role. Due to the deficiencies of other state agencies, the army in the region dedicates considerable effort to subsidiary activities, such as police-style operations.
