= Tenentist revolts in Mato Grosso =

The Brazilian state of Mato Grosso was the focus of tenentist military conspiracies and the stage of a series of revolts in the 1920s: by the command of the Military Circumscription of Mato Grosso (CMMT), in Campo Grande in 1922, by the 10th Regiment of Independent Cavalry (10th RCI) of Bela Vista in 1924, and the 17th Battalion of Caçadores (17th BC) of Corumbá in 1925. Tenentist forces from other states also made incursions into Mato Grosso: the remnants from the São Paulo Revolt, in 1924, and the Prestes Column in 1925 and again in 1926–1927. A state of emergency was in force in the Mato Grosso from August 1924 until the end of 1925, and again from October 1926 to February 1927.

The government's traditional practice of transferring disobedient military personnel to Mato Grosso, added to the poor working conditions in the region, favored the support of its younger officers to the country's armed opposition to President Artur Bernardes, elected in 1922. Mato Grosso's political elite remained aligned with the federal government. In parallel with the Copacabana Fort revolt in Rio de Janeiro, on 5 July, General Clodoaldo da Fonseca gave in to pressure from his subordinates to form a "Provisional Revolutionary Division", but not all subordinate units joined it, and there was no civilian support. Government forces gathered on the opposite bank of the Paraná River, but news of the revolt's defeat in Rio de Janeiro prompted the general to hand over command without a fight.

The planning of the São Paulo Revolt two years later included parallel revolts in Mato Grosso, and one of them took place among the lieutenants of the 10th RCI on 12 July 1924, under the leadership of Riograndino Kruel and Pedro Martins da Rocha. The regiment's own sergeants staged a counter-revolt and arrested the lieutenants, at the cost of two wounded. The following month, rebels from São Paulo tried to occupy southern Mato Grosso and were repelled at the Battle of Três Lagoas, but moved South and continued to fight in the Paraná Campaign. Sergeants Antonio Carlos de Aquino and Adalberto Granja revolted the 17th BC on 27 March, resulting in two dozen injuries in fighting against loyalists from the Brazilian Army, Navy and civilians. The rebels in Paraná formed the Prestes Column and crossed Mato Grosso twice, on their way to Goiás, in May and June 1925, and from Goiás into exile, from October 1926 to February 1927.

== The military environment in Mato Grosso ==
At the beginning of the 1920s, armed struggles between local oligarchs in the state of Mato Grosso (which included current Mato Grosso do Sul at the time) had already passed; the distribution of public offices and political favors had appeased rival factions in the political elite. Internal conflicts were now of another character, promoted by the military. Mato Grosso was a traditional destination for disobedient military personnel. The punitive transfers and terrible working conditions favored the participation of the soldiers who served there in the broader tenentist movement. From 1922 onwards, southern Mato Grosso became a focus of tenentist conspiracy. Ideas comparable to those of the tenentists had already been visible in the revolt of the federal detachment of Ponta Porã in January 1921; Its leader, Lieutenant Heitor Mendes Gonçalves, declared himself against "political excesses and the practice of electoral fraud by the oligarchies in power".

Since 1921, the Brazilian Army units in the state were subordinate to the 1st Military Circumscription, better known by the population and the press as the Military Circumscription of Mato Grosso (CMMT). The circumscription was based in Campo Grande and commanded by a brigadier general. Its units comprised a Mixed Brigade whose commander was the same as the circumscription's. The strength of all complete units would number around 4,500 soldiers, but only the 16th, 17th and 18th Battalions of Caçadores (BCs), a group from the 11th Regiment of Horse Artillery (RAM) and the 10th Independent Cavalry Regiment (RCI) were minimally organized, and even so, with a lack of personnel.

Large sums of public money were spent on building new barracks, but the region's defense suffered from personnel and equipment shortages and routine payment delays of five months, sometimes as long as thirteen months. The development of the Brazilian nation-state in the region was visible in the use of telegraph and railway during the conflicts: reinforcements could arrive via the Northwestern Brazil Railway (NOB), but there were still branches to build and transport continued to depend on trucks and freighters. Until 1924, the CMMT did not have its own military trucks, and relied on private vehicles. The fighting brought investments to the CMMT, and in the following year both sides in the conflict used trucks, but they were still not enough to carry all the soldiers. Horses remained the fastest means of transport for large numbers of troops.

== 1922 ==
=== Revolt of the Military Circumscription ===
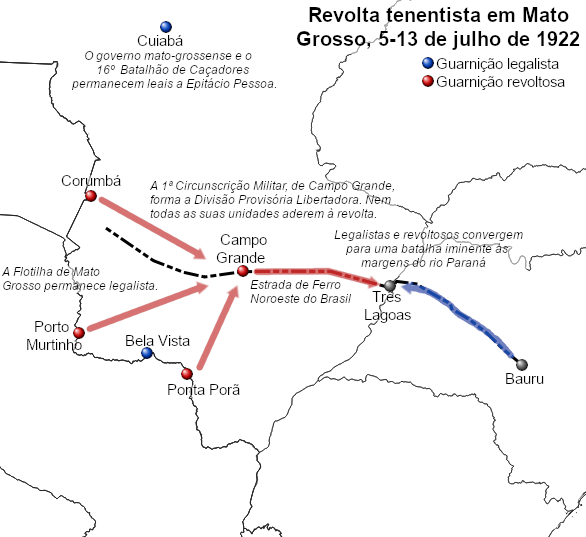
Map of the 1922 revolt in Mato Grosso

The 1922 presidential election infuriated a segment of the Brazilian Army against the incumbent president, Epitácio Pessoa, his elected successor, Artur Bernardes, and the political system of Brazil's Old Republic that they represented. Young officers did not accept the results and wanted to prevent Bernardes from taking office. Once aware that general Joaquim Inácio Cardoso, commander of the CMMT, was preparing an uprising, the government dismissed him on 30 March. On 27 June, the newspaper Gazeta de Notícias, in Rio de Janeiro, announced that "the fruits of the propaganda and personal action of the old and restless general have now emerged and, even with his advice, the revolutionaries intend to act, starting in Ponta Porã, on the border with Paraguay, the military sedition with the uprising of the federal force stationed there. The federal government is now master of everything that happens in Mato Grosso".

General Cardoso's successor, Clodoaldo da Fonseca, took command on 5 July and gathered his officers together in the evening, sharing the news that a revolution had broken out with the support of most of the army, including the garrisons of São Paulo, Rio Grande do Sul, Bahia and Minas Gerais. In truth, however, the revolt was limited to Rio de Janeiro and Niterói and was already a failure. The interruption of telegraph and railway lines meant that officials in Mato Grosso were unaware of the revolt's failure in Rio de Janeiro. The commander of the circumscription was possibly aware of this and went ahead with the revolt for fear of a rebellion by his subordinates or because of the commitment made before his departure to Mato Grosso; his requests during the revolt for Senator Antônio Azeredo to be informed suggested that he did not know about the situation in Rio de Janeiro. Clodoaldo da Fonseca was related to Marshal Hermes da Fonseca, the older leader who had lent his prestige to the young officer movement in Rio de Janeiro. In a statement, Clodoaldo da Fonseca denied that he had ever intended to revolt when he took command, but news of Hermes' arrest would have made him believe that the uprising planned for the end of October had been brought forward.

The revolt's goal, in the words of the commander, was "without interrupting civil order, to force political leaders to agree to declare the presidential election null and void and nominate our candidates". A proclamation explained the revolt to the inhabitants of Mato Grosso and São Paulo. Support was massive among the CMMT officers; the environment found by general Clodoaldo upon arriving in Campo Grande was already rebellious, and after the revolt General Clodoaldo, two colonels, a lieutenant colonel, two majors, seven captains, three first lieutenants, and twelve second lieutenants would be removed from service in the region for their involvement. Clodoaldo da Fonseca's leadership was symbolic, as the initiative actually lay with the lieutenants. Lieutenant Grandville Belorophonte de Lima is named as the true leader of the movement.

=== The Provisional Revolutionary Division ===
The CMMT formed the Provisional Liberation Division, organized into two brigades, receiving units from Campo Grande, Porto Murtinho and Ponta Porã. The main one was the 17th Battalion of Caçadores, under the interim command of lieutenant Joaquim Távora. It is difficult to quantify the amount of troops, but it was possibly between 800 and 1,000 men. The plan was to concentrate the forces in Três Lagoas, cross the Paraná River, enter São Paulo through Araçatuba and face the forces from São Paulo and allies in support of the tenentists in Rio de Janeiro.

The revolutionaries followed a plan, occupying public buildings and calling up reservists. In Corumbá, the military arsenal was broken into to provide weapons and uniforms to the conscripts, but the effort to create another battalion of caçadores was unsuccessful. The revolutionary authorities promised peace and the maintenance of the positions of state civil servants, but in several places they removed civil authorities and looted tax collection and money issuing bodies. Civilian support was limited, existing among supporters of the Republican Reaction. In Porto Murtinho it was larger, but martial law was applied. The movement had the appearance of a military revolt, without enthusiasm from the population.

To the north, in Cuiabá, state governor Pedro Celestino Corrêa da Costa remained loyal to Epitácio Pessoa, although the rebels expected his sympathy due to his connections with Senator Azeredo. In the 16th Battalion of Caçadores, based in the city, the commander delayed orders from the Minister of War to hand over his battalion to state command, but was replaced and the battalion was left outside the authority of Clodoaldo da Fonseca. The 10th Independent Cavalry Regiment (RCI), from Bela Vista, also did not participate. It was divided and its commander was against the revolt. The river monitor Pernambuco, from the Mato Grosso Flotilla, went to Ladário to help combat the revolt. The Minister of War praised the loyalty of the employees of the Post and Telegraph Company and the Northwestern Brazil Railway. They emptied the railway's water tanks to slow the journey and passed telegraphic communications to the loyalists, who managed to decipher the revolutionary plans.

=== Confrontation in the Paraná River ===
The first train only left Campo Grande on 8 July. Upon arriving at Três Lagoas, the crossing point for the state of São Paulo, they discovered that railway employees had removed the ferry from trains and other ships, leaving them on the other bank of the river without essential parts. Even so, the revolutionaries took possession of a boat for 25 to 30 men, captured one, and built another. They positioned four 8-caliber Krupp cannons, taken from the Fort of Coimbra, at the mouth of the Sucuriú river, pointing towards the São Paulo bank. (Note: Coimbra's artillery was the 5th Coastal Artillery Group. Souza 2018, p. 102.)

On 10 July, colonel Tertuliano Potiguara was tasked with crushing the uprising. Brazil's president dismissed Clodoaldo da Fonseca on the 12th. Forces from the 2nd Military Region (including the 4th Battalion of Caçadores) and the Public Force of São Paulo moved to the Paraná River, on the Mato Grosso border. A squadron of three planes carried out reconnaissance. The Public Force contingent included 255 soldiers and 21 officers from its 2nd Infantry Battalion reinforcing colonel Potiguara, while the 4th Battalion, with 617 men, was in reserve in Bauru. (Note: Moraes 2000, p. 60. Before that, since 5 July, it had already sent the 1st Infantry Battalion to Itararé, on the border with Paraná, reinforced on the 11th by elements of the 3rd Battalion.) The government's forces were concentrated near Três Lagoas, on the São Paulo side. A veteran of the First World War, in which he served in the French Army, colonel Potiguara prepared to cross the Paraná River under the cover of his artillery and machine guns.

The fight never took place, however. On 13 July, general Alberto Cardoso de Aguiar conferred with Clodoaldo da Fonseca at the Três Lagoas railway station, convincing him to unconditionally surrender in order to avoid bloodshed. Some of the most radical revolutionaries still wanted to fight, but Clodoaldo handed over command and was arrested. The new commander, general Cardoso de Aguiar, made the units return to headquarters. Mato Grosso reservists, with the exception of those in the 16th BC, were dismissed. Those involved in the revolt were sent in small groups to São Paulo between July and September to answer an investigation, but some escaped into exile in Bolivia and Paraguay.

== 1924 ==
The CMMT commander in 1924 was general João Nepomuceno da Costa. The arrests and desertions after July 1922 reduced the number of officers under his command, and the remainder, in the general's definition, were "frankly rebellious", "avowedly sympathetic" or "without ardor for the cause of supporting the current government". The official status of 1924 was for him "almost the same [as that of 1922], even with new party elements exalted against the winning candidate of the last presidential election". Fugitives from the previous revolt, including Joaquim Távora, organized a new armed revolt, which began in São Paulo on 5 July. His plans included joining units in Mato Grosso, with orders prepared for the garrisons of Coimbra, Corumbá, Campo Grande and Bela Vista. The support from these units did come, but was limited.

In response to the revolt in São Paulo, the army command in Mato Grosso called up reservists and began a large mobilization and concentration of troops in Campo Grande. Approximately 2,000 men were available, at least half of whom were irregulars. The CMMT had orders to form one of the three brigades that would surround the city of São Paulo from the state's countryside. The first objective in the state of São Paulo would be the municipality of Bauru, but the delay in Mato Grosso allowed the rebels to occupy the city on 18 July. Disorganization, distrust and transportation difficulties meant that the first loyalist force only crossed the border on the 29th. General Costa blamed the brigade commander, lieutenant colonel Ciro Daltro, who may have slowed down the movement in favor of the rebels. According to major Frederico Siqueira, who served as head of the General Staff, "the command is not missing his [Daltro's] useless, delaying, harmful actions". Some officers left the state on their own to join the rebels in São Paulo.

=== Revolt of the 10th RCI ===
The command's suspicions were confirmed in Bela Vista, where junior officers revolted the 10th RCI. First lieutenants Pedro Martins da Rocha and Riograndino Kruel were considered the leaders of the movement. First lieutenant Jorge Lobo Machado, second lieutenant Humberto Perreti, second sergeant Waldemar Ramos Pacheco and civilian Accyndino Sampaio, former mayor of Bela Vista, would also be indicted for the failed sedition. General Costa had reasons to believe that Bela Vista would be the center of revolt in other garrisons with which he had contact and even with civilians. In his report he noted lieutenant Kruel's insistence, shortly after arriving in Campo Grande, that he be transferred to Bela Vista, thus being a likely emissary of the conspirators in São Paulo. When serving in the 7th RCI, in Cacequi, Rio Grande do Sul, he was involved in possible arms smuggling. Other evidence of connections is that sergeant Pacheco took the regiment's car to Corumbá with a letter to request the troop's support.

The regiment's commander, lieutenant colonel Péricles de Albuquerque, was arrested on the morning of 12 July at his residence. His trusted captains, Carlos Alberto Kiehl and João Jansen Lobo Pereira, were also detained. Lieutenant Rocha then telegraphed Isidoro Dias Lopes, leader of the revolt in São Paulo, putting himself at his service. Another telegram to the War Ministry announced his break with the government. The rebels occupied the telegraph station, but telegraphist Bonifácio Ferreira managed to warn the authorities and keep the regiment's sergeants up to date with loyalist countermeasures. General Costa ordered the blocking of exits from Bela Vista to Ponta Porã, Miranda, Nioaque, Aquidauana and Porto Murtinho. The revolt would be suppressed by the 11th RCI, from Ponta Porã, with the support of the state government and Companhia Mate Laranjeira and the mobilization of customs guards, cowboys and others. But the revolt was controlled within the regiment itself by the sergeants, who arrested their officers during the curfew search, on the night of 12 July. Two corporals were injured by the rebels at that time. This rare case of counter-revolution by the lower ranks was rewarded with the promotion of 18 sergeants.

In general Nepomuceno Costa's account, his telegrams were even sent to the rebels, exaggerating the situation of the loyalist troops, a stratagem that would have motivated the sergeants to start the counter-revolt. The account is full of its own praise; the rebels would not have had the courage to face "an old soldier who knows neither difficulties nor sacrifices, for the strict fulfillment of his military duties". The newspaper A Capital, apparently to belittle the commander's praise for the state governor and other figures, published an anonymous missive criticizing the conduct of loyalist operations. Its author highlighted that the telegrams were sent in place of formal operations orders, and there was no general operations order with an attack plan; "force commanders could manage as they saw fit". The general would have been left without his aide-de-camp and chief of staff, assigning them to command units. Against the author of the letter, it could be argued that telegraphic communication was easy, a quick response was needed and there was a lack of officers in the Military Circumscription.

Fears of revolt also existed in Campo Grande, after the departure of loyalist officers for the campaign in São Paulo, and in the 17th BC in Corumbá. General Costa ordered the Mato Grosso Flotilla to bomb the 17th BC if there was an uprising during its embarkation.

=== Passage of the São Paulo column ===
The rebels left the city of São Paulo on the night of 27 to 28 July and stopped in Bauru, from where they could continue to Mato Grosso or Paraná. The option of an offensive against Mato Grosso initially convinced the rebel leadership. They hoped to receive support, create the "Free State of the South" or "Brasilândia", financed with yerba mate exports, and continue the fight against the government taking advantage of the easy-to-defend geography. Instead of the more direct route to Três Lagoas, which was already defended, they followed the Sorocabana Railway to Presidente Epitácio, on the banks of the Paraná River. The Mato Grosso loyalists withdrew their forces in Bauru to Três Lagoas, where they were reinforced by the detachment of colonel Malan d'Angrogne, with units from Minas Gerais. On 18 August, rebel commander Juarez Távora led a battalion in an offensive against Três Lagoas, suffering a defeat with high casualties south of the city, in the town of Campo Japonês. On the 26th, the federal government extended the state of emergency to Mato Grosso. The measure was extended until December 31, 1925.

The rebel defeat in Três Lagoas made them abandon their plans to occupy Mato Grosso. Their efforts then headed towards Paraná, where the vanguard reached Foz do Iguaçu on 14 September. The rest of the revolutionary army would still take some time to arrive; general Isidoro only disembarked in Guaíra, upstream from Foz do Iguaçu, on 15 October, and in the meantime, they were resisted by Mato Grosso loyalist irregulars on the way down the Paraná River. One of the rebellious battalions was ambushed and surrendered to the people of Mato Grosso on 24 September. In October, general Costa handed over command of the Military Circumscription of Mato Grosso to colonel Malan, considering the effort to prevent the rebels from entering the state successful.

== 1925–1927 ==
From 12 to 13 February 1925, evidence of a conspiracy by sergeants in the 6th Engineering Battalion (BE), in Aquidauana, led to the arrest of 14 soldiers, three of whom were expelled from the army. One of them was reservist sergeant Adalberto Granja, (Note: According to historian Valmir Batista Corrêa, his name would actually be Armando Granja. Lourenço Moreira Lima and several newspapers used the name Adalberto (Souza 2018, p. 360).) a later participant in the Prestes Column and an acquaintance of Lourenço Moreira Lima, secretary of the column. Granja discussed revolt plans with sergeants in Campo Grande and Aquidauana, having been tasked with revolting the 17th BC, in Corumbá, the unit where his brother served. The conspirators in this battalion had links with the 11th RCI, from Ponta Porã. In both units there was a revolt on 27 March, but the officers of the 11th RCI managed to quell the movement inside the barracks.

Corumbá was isolated from the main ongoing tenentist effort in the Paraná Campaign, in which the rebel forces were about to suffer a major defeat in Catanduvas. Nothing suggests a plan to move to Paraná, but a revolt in Corumbá could distract the loyalist forces. Their motivations may have been disciplinary and ideological. Disciplinary incidents had occurred in the battalion the previous month, and sergeants and enlisted men were behind on their salaries and felt persecuted by the battalion's supervisor. The ideological connection to tenentism is evident in the leadership of Adalberto Granja. The two main leaders were Granja and Antonio Carlos de Aquino, a sergeant with a good reputation among soldiers and civilians. Sergeants João Leite de Figueiredo, Marcondes Fontes Esperidião Ferraz, Bertholdo de Souza Papa and Lydio de Gomes Barros and corporal Arlindo are also cited as leaders.

=== Revolt of the 17th BC ===
The riot began at dawn in the infirmary. In general Malan d'Angrogne's account, the battalion commander, captain Luiz de Oliveira Pinto, "slept in a hammock, in an open room, in the barracks, such was his confidence in his men. Awakened to screams, subdued despite resisting, he was taken by pushes and punches to the jail, where he was locked up, while the prisoners, released, took up positions with the other soldiers". Officers who arrived at the barracks were arrested. The rebels also arrested the commander of the Public Force, lieutenant Arthur Xavier Sobrinho, along with ten of his soldiers, and occupied the post office and telegraph. Telegraphist David Paulo de Lacerda jumped over the wall of his station and informed the commander of the Mato Grosso Flotilla, in Ladário. Telegraph staff kept loyalists informed through secret communications.

Sergeant Granja hoped to obtain civilian support and hand over the direction of the revolt to colonel Fructuoso Mendes, head of the Military Enlistment Circumscription, as he was a known anti-Bernardes and had been arrested in 1922. The civilians did not join in, much less so the colonel, who led the counter-revolt with the collaboration of the municipal intendant Cyriaco Felix de Toledo. The navy, civilians, army officers who were outside the barracks, and some sergeants and soldiers fought at least one to two hours of violent fighting in the city, leaving two dozen people injured, until the rebels lost their positions outside the barracks. Captain Pinto himself, locked in the battalion's jail, managed to convince the guards to release him around 11:00. He was then able to gather loyal soldiers and end the mutiny. According to Lourenço Moreira Lima, the rebels themselves handed over their leaders to the captain.

The commander ordered the execution by firing squad of sergeants Granja and Aquino. Adalberto Granja, despite being injured, escaped, joined the Prestes Column and was photographed with it in Piauí. He was later captured and died in the penal colony of Clevelândia. Antonio Carlos de Aquino, according to Lourenço Moreira Lima's account, was beaten and hit by dozens of bullets when he fell to the ground. The captain concluded the execution by kicking the corpse in the face. The sergeant appeared alive in a report in the newspaper O Mato Grosso, published on 28 December 1930, according to the "revolutionary of 1924" he escaped on his way to execution, was presumed dead, took part in the Revolution of 1930 and reappeared in public. However, the newspaper used a different name, "Pedro Aquino", and the news was not reproduced in any other newspaper.

=== Passage of the Prestes Column ===
Once defeated in Paraná, the tenentists reorganized their 1st Revolutionary Division, better known as Prestes Column, and crossed Paraguayan territory to reenter Brazil, invading Mato Grosso. The division had about a thousand ragged men, with little ammunition and horses, and found an abundance of cattle and other resources in southern Mato Grosso. The vanguard (2nd RC), led by João Alberto Lins de Barros, crossed the border on 30 April and on 6 May had its first fight in the town of Panchita. The government forces in the region, under the command of colonel Péricles de Albuquerque, numbered around 600 men, including a company from Rio de Janeiro and another from Curitiba. Other detachments continued to cross the border: the 3rd BC of Virgílio dos Santos crossed Porto Felicidade, on the Amambaí river, on 7 May, and the 1st Railway Battalion, of Cordeiro de Farias, occupied the port Dom Carlos, on the right bank of the Paraná River, the following day.

On 8 May, colonel Albuquerque ordered his Mato Grosso South Detachment to retreat towards Campo Grande, 350 kilometers away. Ponta Porã was abandoned by the 11th RCI and occupied by the regiments of João Alberto and Siqueira Campos (3rd RC). The loyalist headquarters in Campo Grande disagreed with the decision to abandon Ponta Porã and sent major Bertoldo Klinger to head the Detachment's General Staff, effectively assuming its command. On 13 May, Klinger had the Detachment entrenched at the head of the Apa River. The Revolutionary Division's first attacks against this position were unsuccessful. At this point, its leadership definitively abandoned the idea of a decisive battle in Mato Grosso and decided to move towards Goiás.

Klinger attempted a pincer movement against Dourados on 27 May, but the Revolutionary Division had already left and was a week ahead in its march. His attempts to negotiate a surrender were met with no response. On 1 June, the rebels were all on the north bank of the Norhwestern Brazil Railway tracks and on the 4th they had already occupied Jaraguari, 68 kilometers north of Campo Grande. On 32 June, they crossed the border with Goiás near the city of Mineiros, having marched two thousand kilometers in Mato Grosso. The loyalists continued on their trail.

The Prestes Column returned to Mato Grosso more than a year later, but it was in full retreat into exile. At the beginning of September 1926, a force of three thousand soldiers from the Public Force of São Paulo attempted to intercept them on the central plateau of Goiás, but the rebels maneuvered around the "barrier" and penetrated into Mato Grosso near the mouth of the Araguaia River. On 22 October, the column was reduced to 800 men, 600 of them able-bodied, with very little ammunition, but it was already 400 kilometers from the border with Bolivia. The state of emergency was reestablished in Mato Grosso on the 30th and extended until the beginning of the following year. The main body of the Revolutionary Division crossed the Pantanal and surrendered to Bolivian authorities on 4 February 1927. On 10 February, a decree by the new president Washington Luís suspended the state of emergency in Goiás and Mato Grosso "because the armed revolt that had raged in Brazil since 1922 had been extinguished".
