= Battle of Três Lagoas =

1924 event of Brazil's São Paulo Revolt

- Part of the São Paulo Revolt of 1924
Date	17–18 August 1924
Location	Campo Japonês, Três Lagoas, Brazil
Result	Government victory!

Belligerents
Tenentist rebels	Brazil; Brazilian Army; Public Force of Minas Gerais

Commanders and leaders
Juarez Távora	Malan d'Angrogne

Units involved
3rd Battalion	Amaral Column; 12th Infantry Regiment

Strength
570	Unknown

Casualties and losses
114: 24 killed 23 wounded 63 captured	32: 4 killed 28 wounded

The Battle of Três Lagoas was an offensive by tenentist rebels against Brazilian government forces on 17–18 August 1924, extending the São Paulo Revolt into southern Mato Grosso. Led by Juarez Távora, the rebels suffered heavy losses to loyalist troops from Minas Gerais, under the command of colonel Malan d'Angrogne, in the town of Campo Japonês. This defeat frustrated the rebels' ambition to settle in Mato Grosso, forcing them to start the Paraná Campaign.

From the beginning, the São Paulo Revolt involved the Military Circumscription of Mato Grosso, which needed to mobilize large troops and occupy the city of Bauru, in the interior of São Paulo. Low ranking officers in Mato Grosso were a nucleus of tenentist conspiracy, which even launched a revolt in the 10th Independent Cavalry Regiment (RCI), in Bela Vista, on 12 July; the regimental sergeants themselves controlled this uprising. Due to the deficiencies of the military structure in the state, Bauru was not occupied in time and the rebels passed through the city freely on their way to Porto Tibiriçá, on the banks of the Paraná River, which made São Paulo's border with Mato Grosso.

The rebels expected troops to join them in Mato Grosso, where they would found the "Brasilândia" or "Free State of the South". Possessing an easy-to-defend geography, they would have good conditions to prolong their war against the federal government. But the revolutionary command was indecisive for a few days, giving the government time to reinforce Três Lagoas, where the Noroeste do Brasil Railway connected the two states. In addition to units from Mato Grosso, the loyalists received the Malan column, coming from Minas Gerais. At the head of a reinforced battalion, with a shock force of foreign fighters, Juarez Távora went up the Paraná River and landed near the city on 17 August. Drought and heat exhausted the troops.

The battle was fought in the morning of the next day against elements of the Malan column. The rebels conquered the first line, occupied by the Amaral Column (from the Public Force of Minas Gerais), a contingent inferior in numbers and weapons. This gave enough time for the 12th Infantry Regiment, a Brazilian Army unit, to position a company on the attackers flank. When the latter charged the first retreating line, they were targeted by machine-gun fire at close range. This provoked a widespread flight, made even more chaotic by a fire in the nearby field.

Demoralized, the survivors returned to the rest of the revolutionary army in Porto Tibiriçá. General João Nepomuceno da Costa, commander of the Military Circumscription, considered the threat of invasion of Mato Grosso to be over. The loyalist concentration in Três Lagoas left the road to Paraná little protected. In this state, rebels from São Paulo joined those from Rio Grande do Sul in 1925, forming the Miguel Costa-Prestes Column, which again invaded Mato Grosso, this time passing through Paraguay.

== Background ==
=== Tenentist influence in the region ===
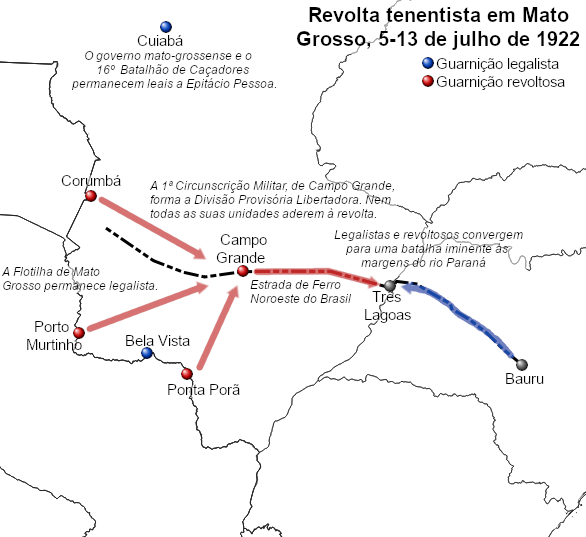
Map of the first tenentist revolt in Mato Grosso

Tenentism has a long history in southern Mato Grosso (which had not yet separated from the north), as part of broader military participation in local political struggles. The lower ranks of the Military Circumscription of Mato Grosso massively joined the first tenentist revolt, which began in 1922 in Rio de Janeiro. The uprising was led by the commander of the Military Circumscription, general Clodoaldo da Fonseca, but he was not the real leader and merely followed the initiative and pressure of the young officers. Sympathy for the revolt was not shared by all garrisons and ranks; there were loyalist demonstrations by sergeants. The state government in Cuiabá did not accept the revolt, and there was no popular enthusiasm. The rebels lowered their weapons without resistance when loyalist forces from São Paulo reached the border.

Several of those involved fled into exile in neighboring countries, escaping arrest, and the region became a hotbed of military conspiracy. The second lieutenant revolt, which broke out in São Paulo in 1924, had captain Joaquim Távora as one of its main articulators. In 1922, this officer commanded the 17th Battalion of Caçadores (BC), from Corumbá, the main force of the rebels in Mato Grosso. He was arrested, released and considered a deserter, devoting himself to the conspiracy. The planners of the new uprising had supporters in Mato Grosso, having even prepared orders for the units in Coimbra, Corumbá, Campo Grande and Bela Vista. After the outbreak of the São Paulo revolt on 5 July, this prediction came true, but only to a certain extent.

=== Revolt of the 10th Independent Cavalry Regiment ===
In Campo Grande there were rumors of an uprising. The Mato Grosso flotilla received orders from General João Nepomuceno da Costa, commander of the Military Circumscription, to bomb the 17th BC if it joined the revolt. But there was only a real uprising in Bela Vista, in the 10th Independent Cavalry Regiment (RCI). On 12 July, officers led by lieutenants Pedro Martins da Rocha and Riograndino Kruel arrested the commander, lieutenant colonel Péricles de Albuquerque, and two trusted captains. Their objective was to unite with the São Paulo rebels.

The rebels occupied the telegraph station, but the telegraph operator Bonifácio Ferreira managed to warn the authorities and keep the regimental sergeants abreast of loyalist countermeasures. General Costa intended to block the exits from Bela Vista to Ponta Porã, Miranda, Nioaque, Aquidauana and Porto Murtinho. The revolt would be quelled by the 11th RCI, from Ponta Porã, with the support of the state government and the Mate Laranjeira Company and the mobilization of customs guards, local guides and others. But the revolt was brought under control within the regiment itself by the sergeants, who arrested their officers at curfew review on the night of 12 July. Two corporals were wounded by the rebels at that moment. This rare case of counterrevolution from lower ranks was rewarded by the promotion of 18 sergeants.

The circumscription command had reasons to believe that Bela Vista would be the radiating pole of revolts in other garrisons. The joining of the Mato Grosso garrisons to the revolt in São Paulo was plausible for the government; according to general Costa, the officers were "almost the same [as in 1922], with the addition of new partisan elements exalted against the winning candidate of the last presidential election". Constant delays in the payment of salaries left the low level of officers and the enlisted men unhappy. Some officers left Mato Grosso on their own to join the São Paulo rebels, and the prospect of recruiting rebels was one of the reasons for the revolutionary army's incursion into the state.

== Operational situation ==
=== Mobilization of the Military Circumscription of Mato Grosso ===
In response to the São Paulo Revolt, the Brazilian Army began a major mobilization and concentration of troops in Campo Grande. The Mato Grosso units were understaffed, and only the 16th, 17th, 18th BCs, a group from the 11th Mounted Artillery Regiment (RAM) and the 10th RCI were minimally organized. The summoning of reservists, recently implemented in the army, had poor results. Colonels were much more effective; of the approximately 2,000 men available, at least half were irregulars ("patriotic elements") called up by private agents, forming reserve units such as the 66th, 67th and 68th BCs and the 50th RCI. Reservists served in these units, but the officers were often from the former National Guard, and, due to the influence of the colonels, the army had little confidence in them.

The army's plans to quell the São Paulo Revolt included the Mato Grosso Military Circumscription from the beginning: it would contribute one of the three brigades that would come from neighboring states to occupy the rear of the rebels, isolating them in the city of São Paulo. The first objective was to occupy the city of Três Lagoas, on the border with São Paulo, on an emergency basis. There passed the Noroeste do Brasil Railway, and for this reason it was the focus of operations in 1922 and 1924. The first unit at this location was the 1st Company of the 17th BC. During the course of the conflict, the city became a logistics center with large stocks of war material and foodstuffs.

=== The run to Bauru ===
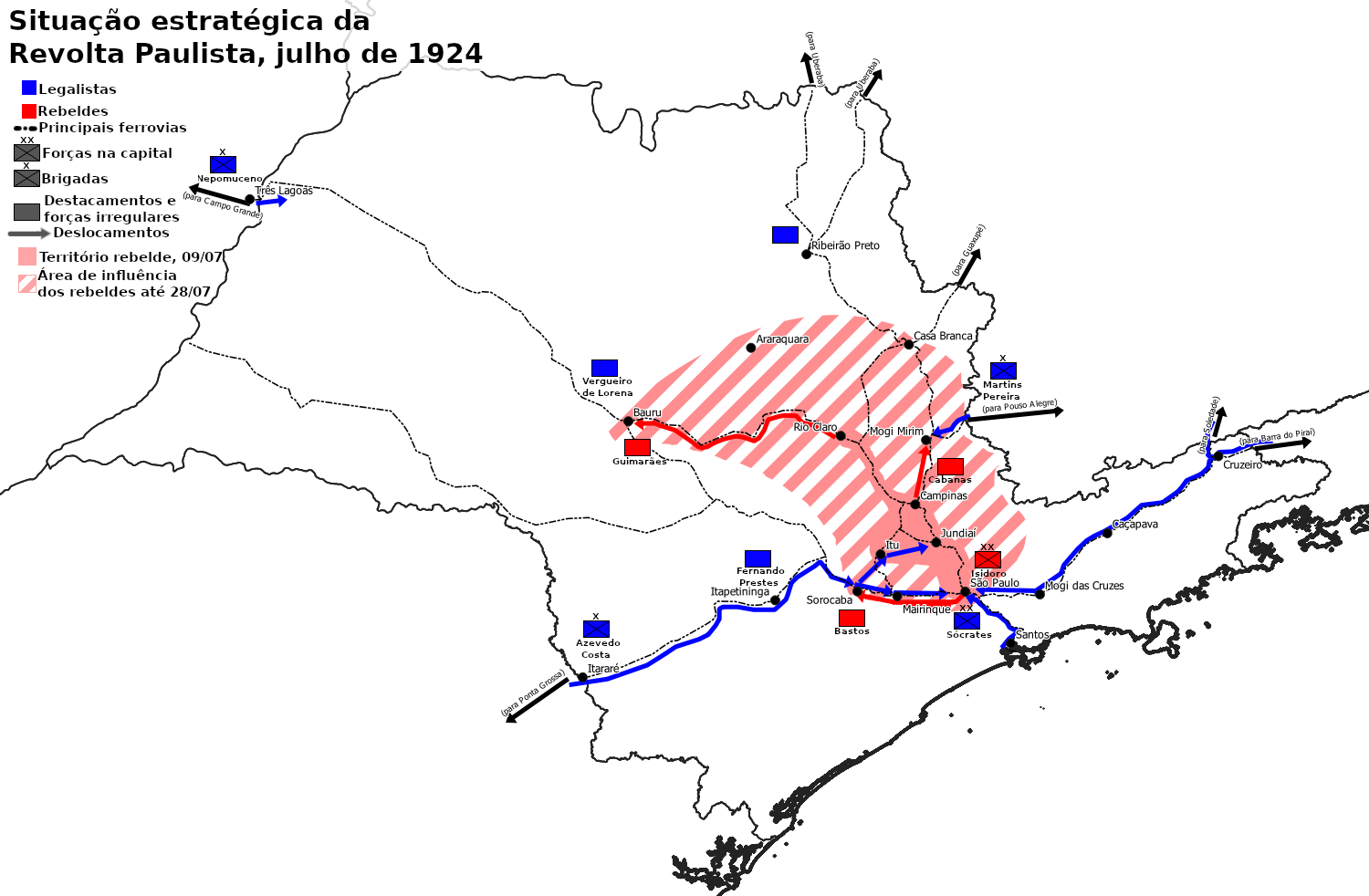
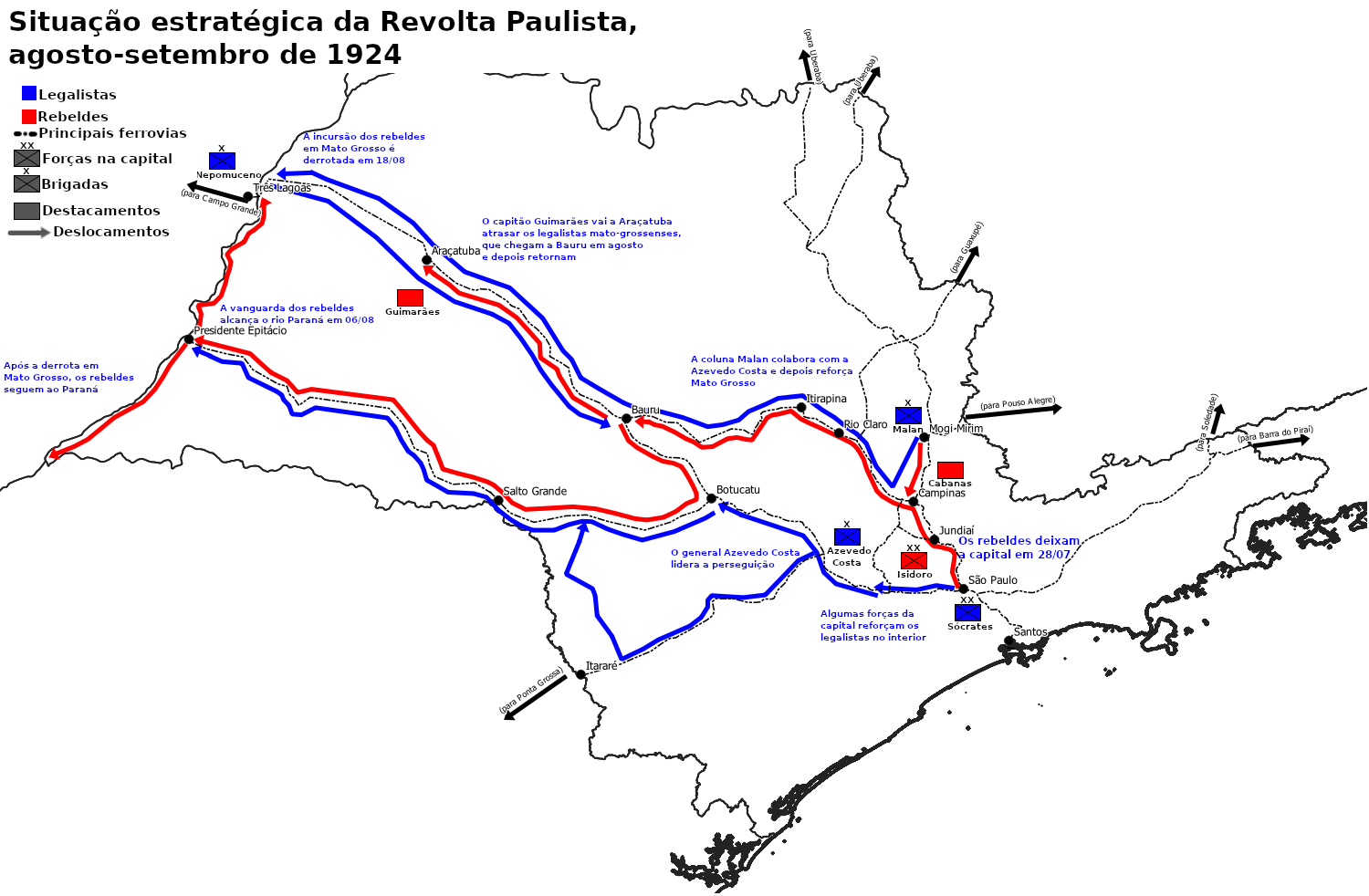
Military situation in the interior of São Paulo in July (top) and August (bottom)

Then, it was necessary to quickly occupy Bauru, in São Paulo. This city, at the convergence of three railroads, was an almost obligatory passage from the capital of São Paulo to Mato Grosso. However, Mato Grosso loyalists were too slow to prevent the occupation of the city by the rebels on 18 July. The journey from Campo Grande to Três Lagoas by rail took a few hours, but 20 days passed from the orders of concentration until the arrival at the destination. Transport was precarious — the circumscription, in the absence of its own trucks, depended on private individuals. The beginning of operations was marked by disorganization, improvisation and the government's mistrust of its troops. An anonymous letter published later in the newspaper A Capital accused general Nepomuceno of ineptitude.

Only on 29 July did the first force cross the Paraná River, on the border, and even then it was delayed due to lack of supplies and ammunition. At that time, the revolutionary army had already left the city of São Paulo and arrived in Bauru, heading towards the Paraná River. Instead of heading northwest directly to Três Lagoas, they decided to reach the border via the Sorocabana Railway, passing through Botucatu. On 1 August the circumscription was organized as an army detachment, with two mixed brigades and a cavalry brigade. The vanguard for the occupation of Bauru would be lieutenant colonel Ciro Daltro's 1st Mixed Brigade, but he may have deliberately delayed the movement because he sympathized with his opponent. On 5 July the city was occupied by the 18th BC and the 50th RCI, but the rebels had already left the place. The Mato Grosso people met there with Colonel Malan d'Angrogne, who was bringing his own loyalist column from Minas Gerais.

=== Operations in the Paraná river ===
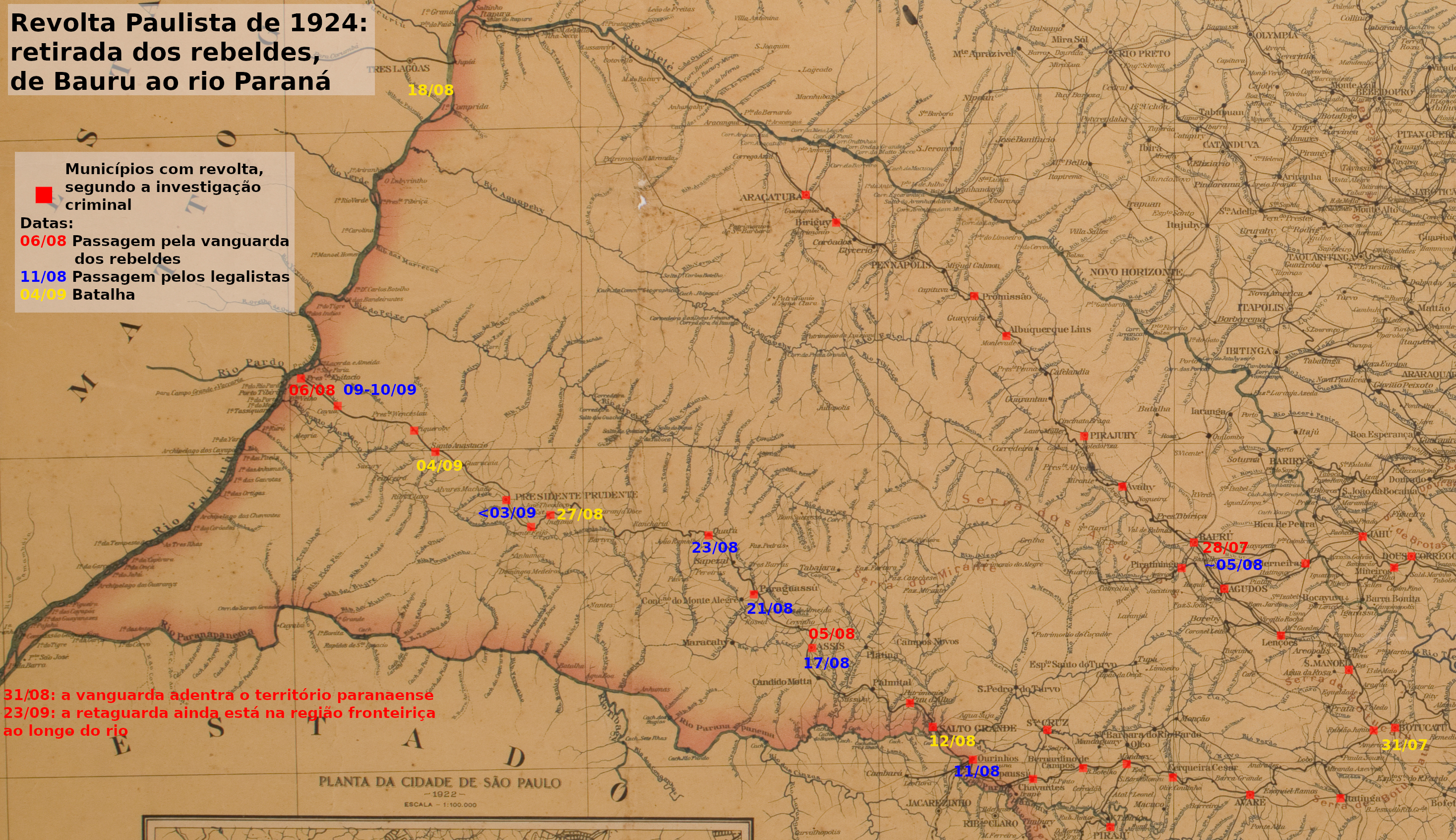
Map of the extreme west of São Paulo and the banks of the Paraná River

The troops present in Bauru were withdrawn to defend Três Lagoas, but this movement was slow. Further south on the border, spies from the 11th RCI watched the river crossing towards Paraná. 60–120 men from the 66th BC, commanded by colonel Germano Fetchner, stayed in Porto XV de Novembro, a town next to Porto Tibiriçá, on the São Paulo side of the border. This other city was occupied on 6 August by the vanguard of the revolutionary army, capturing a small loyalist contingent and the steamers Guairá, Paraná, Rio Pardo, Brilhante and Conde de Frontin. With only unprepared recruits, in a disadvantageous position on the ground, the commander abandoned Porto XV de Novembro and established new positions in Porto Uerê, leaving free navigation on the Paraná River.

In Porto Tibiriçá, the revolutionary command disagreed about the next step, which could be Mato Grosso or Paraná. General Isidoro Dias Lopes, leader of the revolt, preferred Mato Grosso, as it would bring more immediate results. His information was that Três Lagoas was weakly defended. Asdrúbal Gwyer de Azevedo, commander of the vanguard, wanted an immediate attack on Três Lagoas, but the leadership took too long to decide. The government had time to reinforce the site; troops in Bauru had already returned to Três Lagoas on 10 August, and by 16 August the Malan column had also taken up positions in defense of that town.

== The offensive on Mato Grosso ==
=== The "Brasilândia" project ===
Mato Grosso offered the rebels an easy geography to defend. As described by João Cabanas, artillery would prevent passage along the Paraná River, the Fort of Coimbra would not allow any ship to go up the Paraguay River, and mobile columns would suffice on the cattle roads to Minas Gerais. A loyalist invasion from the north would be decimated by nature itself. The government could be fought on an equal footing in conventional warfare.

In possession of one of the largest states of the federation, the revolutionaries would proclaim the state of Brasilândia, or the Free State of the South. The export tariffs on yerba mate would be enough to finance the Free State, and the population would benefit from the elimination of import taxes. Within six months, elections would be held in the new territory, and neighboring countries were expected to recognize the state of belligerence. With their position consolidated in Mato Grosso, the revolutionaries could reconquer São Paulo and march to Rio de Janeiro, force the government of Artur Bernardes to negotiate, or, in the worst-case scenario, go into exile in Paraguay or Bolivia.

=== Expeditions ===
Three expeditions were launched against Mato Grosso, respectively commanded by Luiz Barbedo, Luiz França de Albuquerque and Juarez Távora. The latter was the strongest. Captain Távora commanded the 3rd Battalion of the revolutionary army, (Note: As of 29 July, it was organized into three brigades and seven battalions (Savian 2020, p. 98). See São Paulo Revolt of 1924 in the interior#Reorganization in Bauru.) reinforced by the Gwyer and Azhaury companies, from the França de Albuquerque battalion, and an artillery section of captain Filinto Müller. The shock troops were made up of foreign volunteers, especially captain Kuhn's Germans. All these elements added up to 570 men, according to the commander. Foreigners were up to half the staff.

The battalion went up the river in two steamers and disembarked 27 kilometers from Três Lagoas on the morning of 17 August. In a hurry, the rebels did not take their kitchens. Heat and thirst exhausted the soldiers; according to captain Ítalo Landucci, "the drought was at its height: beyond the banks of the rivers, the land was becoming scorched and most of the rivers had dried up". The plan was for a forced march, looping to the left, to attack the loyalists from the southwest. Juarez Távora blamed the local guide for the maneuver not going as planned. (Note: Heller 2006, p. 72. “The execution of that plan was completely altered, due to the bad faith or self-indulgence of the local guide who led the 3rd Battalion on its march from Fazenda Moeda to Porto Independência. Instead of leading the battalion along the marginal edge of the Paraná forest, and crossing the Ribeiro do Palmito, halfway between Campo Japonês and Porto Independência (slightly above the confluence of the small tributary on its right bank) — after crossing this small tributary, he bordered the aforementioned creek, without crossing it, until he found the 'cattle' road, at the point occupied by the Gwyer Company". (Uma Vida e Muitas Lutas, cited in Andrade 1976, pp. 95–96).) At dusk, they had their first collision with a loyalist cavalry picket. The troops slept on horseback on the road, in combat formation.

== The battle in Campo Japonês ==
The battalion attacked the following morning, clashing with elements of the Malan detachment in Campo Japonês. (Note: Or Posto Japonês, located between Porto Moeda and Três Lagoas (Andrade 1976, p. 86).) The first line was occupied by the Amaral Column of the Public Force of Minas Gerais. Commanded by major Octavio Campos do Amaral, it was a force of only 145 men, lacking sapper tools and automatic weapons. The 12th Infantry Regiment (12th RI), from Belo Horizonte, was in the rear, commanded by colonel Diógenes Monteiro Tourinho. The rebels advanced, according to the narrative of a newspaper in the capital, with a "charge of bayonets, in a very impetuous charge and with a barbaric clamor in a strange language".

The Amaral Column fought at a great disadvantage, and after almost an hour, it was almost enveloped and began to retreat to the trenches of a company of the 12th RI. This time was enough for the 12th RI to reposition itself, which was not noticed by the rebels, as it was difficult to distinguish the enemy in the grass. The 3rd Battalion, in the last positions before Três Lagoas, did not realize that another company of the 12th Infantry Division was on its flank. (Note: "Managing to place himself against the left flank of the attackers" (Andrade 1976, p. 89); "A loyalist company crossed on the right flank and this only became clear when the rebels began to receive fire from the rear on that side". (Heller 2006, p. 71).) Casualties were already heavy, but the soldiers could hear the snort of the Noroeste locomotives, convincing them that the enemy was retreating. According to a historian of the Public Force of Minas Gerais, the withdrawal of the Amaral Column "led the rebels to the fatal mistake of assuming that such retreat was an escape, then investing desperately and en masse". (Note: Meirelles 2002, p. 214 prefers to emphasize the capture of a field kitchen by the starving soldiers of the 3rd Battalion. Heller 2006, p. 71 also cites this case, but does not omit the company that crossed on the flank.)

At that moment, the other company of the 12th RI opened fire from heavy machine guns at close range, with "grazing and crossed shots". On foot and unprotected in an infantry charge, the attackers panicked and began to flee in a rout. In colonel Tourinho's recapitulation:

One of the companies was placed in the 2nd line, in support of the police from Minas Gerais, which was already occupying the 1st line and the Lamego company was ordered to march along the road to Porto Independência [...] The action was carried out with violence in its first phase, assuming that the attackers reached the strength of 300 men, their main effort from the beginning being very accentuated on our right flank, which led to a withdrawal on this flank from our first lines in this critical first phase. After a reorganization of the troops on that flank, with the reinforcement of mounted artillerymen and other elements that I organized at the time, the enemy pressure was significantly reduced there, and then our action began on the left flank, by the Lamego company, which had reached the ordered position, hitting the enemy from the flank and rear, resulting in his immediate defeat and causing his retreat in panic.

To add to the terror, a fire raged through the dry scrubland, attributed to one side or the other depending on the source. Juarez Távora reported not having been at the beginning of the battle. When he was notified at noon, all he had to do was pick up the stragglers. At 22:00, the last transport ship left with the survivors for Porto Tibiriçá. The commander landed them on the other side of the Paraná so as not to contaminate the rest of the revolutionary army with demoralization.

=== Casualties ===
Tenentist Nelson Tabajara de Oliveira defined what happened as "the bloodiest combat of the São Paulo revolution". The defeat was disastrous. The fire charred many corpses, making identification impossible. Juarez Távora counted the loss, among dead, wounded and prisoners, of about 100 men and four heavy machine guns. The government commander found 24 dead on 20 August and others the following day, with the capture of 90 rebels. Gazeta de Notícias published 24 dead, 23 wounded and 67 prisoners, figures confirmed in general Costa's report. Foreigners were the majority of prisoners. Ítalo Landucci reported 400 casualties, a figure that is probably overestimated. According to the Public Force, 50 dead, 51 prisoners and a lot of weapons were left behind. Of the 600 attackers that landed, only 80 to 100 would have managed to re-embark. General Oscar de Barros Falcão recorded the loss of 4 dead and 28 wounded in the loyalist army. The Public Force of Minas Gerais recorded three dead, seven prisoners and ten missing.

== Consequences ==
The defeat in Mato Grosso left the state of Paraná as the only option for the rebels. Thanks to the loyalist concentration in Três Lagoas, the way to the south was open. In western Paraná, there was still hope of joining the conspirators who were planning another revolt in Rio Grande do Sul. The ensuing Paraná Campaign began on 31 August. Portions of Mato Grosso territory were still conflagrated on the descent to Paraná. The Military Circumscription, taking advantage of the slow movement, temporarily cut contact between the vanguard and the rearguard of the rebels, and on 25 September, forced the surrender of one of its battalions in the region of Porto Jacaré.

General Costa handed over command of the Military Circumscription to colonel Malan in October 1924, considering the objective of putting aside the revolt in Mato Grosso completed. Mato Grosso loyalists reoccupied Guaíra in April 1925, in the final phase of the Paraná Campaign, apparently cornering the rebels, who now formed the Miguel Costa-Prestes Column. To their surprise, the rebels crossed Paraguayan territory and entered Mato Grosso, fighting several battles before proceeding to Goiás, continuing their guerrilla warfare. The fighting in Mato Grosso drew the attention of the federal government, which invested more resources in the defense of the region.

In Três Lagoas, the battle is still remembered at the Soldier's Cemetery, where the tomb of loyalist José Carvalho de Lima is located, who would have died during the battle. This soldier became an object of religious devotion, and other dead, mostly children, were buried around his tomb. (Note: It is not one of the dead or missing soldiers of the Public Force of Minas Gerais, whose names are given in Andrade 1976, p. 90.)
