= 9th Military Region =

9th Military Region may refer to:

- 9th Military Region (Brazil)
- 9th Military Region (Vietnam People's Army)
