= Western Military Command (Brazil) =

- Comando Militar do Oeste
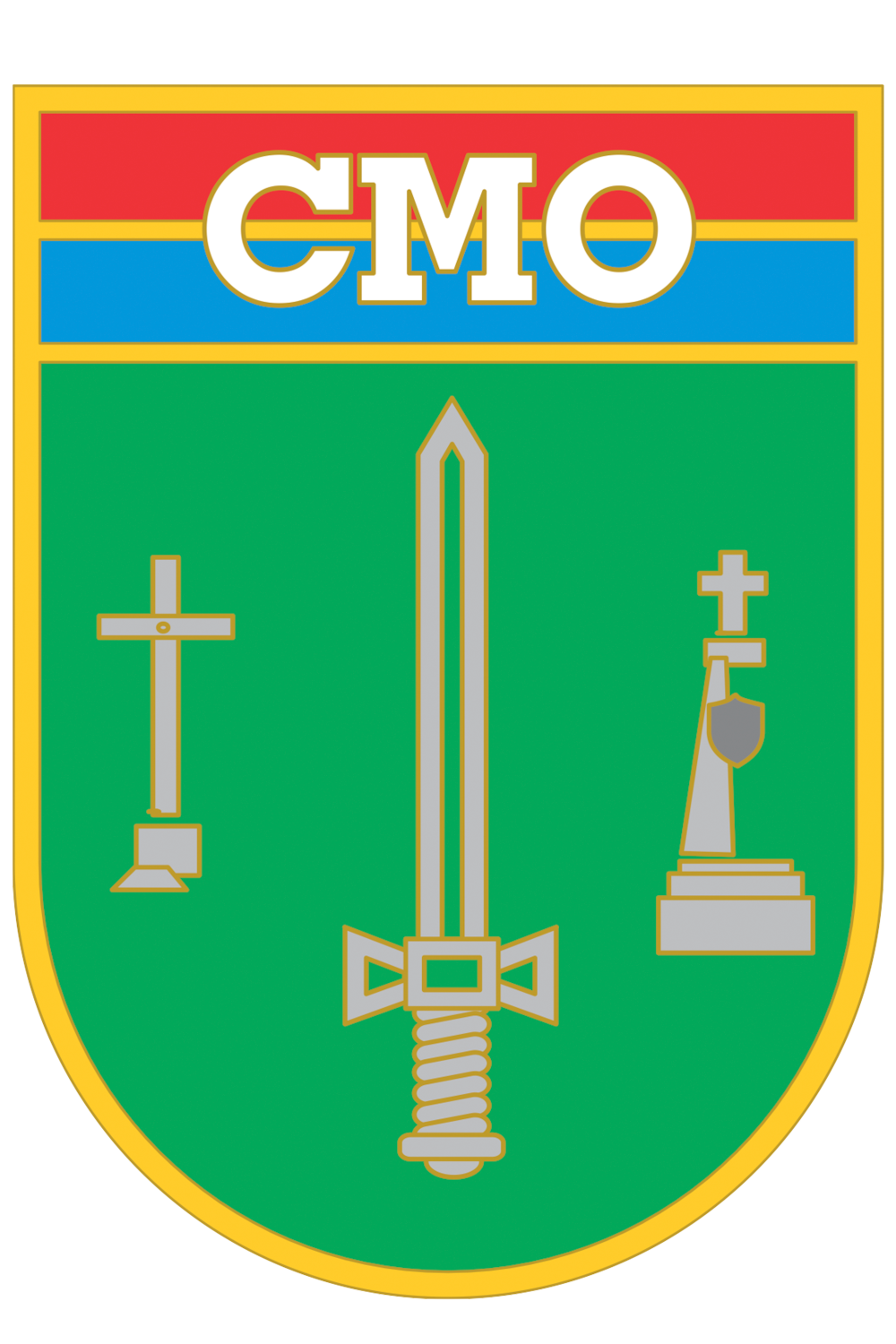
- Active: 1985; 41 years ago
- Country: Brazil
- Branch: Brazilian Army
- Part of: 9.ª Região Militar
- Garrison/HQ: Av. Duque de Caxias, 1628 - Vila Alba, Campo Grande - MS, 79100-400
- Decorations: Order of Military Merit

Commanders
- Current commander: Gen. Luiz Fernando Estorilho Baganha

The Western Military Command (Portuguese: Comando Militar do Oeste or CMO) is one of the eight Military Commands of the Brazilian Army. The Western Military Command is responsible for the defense of the states Mato Grosso and Mato Grosso do Sul.

== Structure ==
Area of the Comando Militar do Oeste 2017

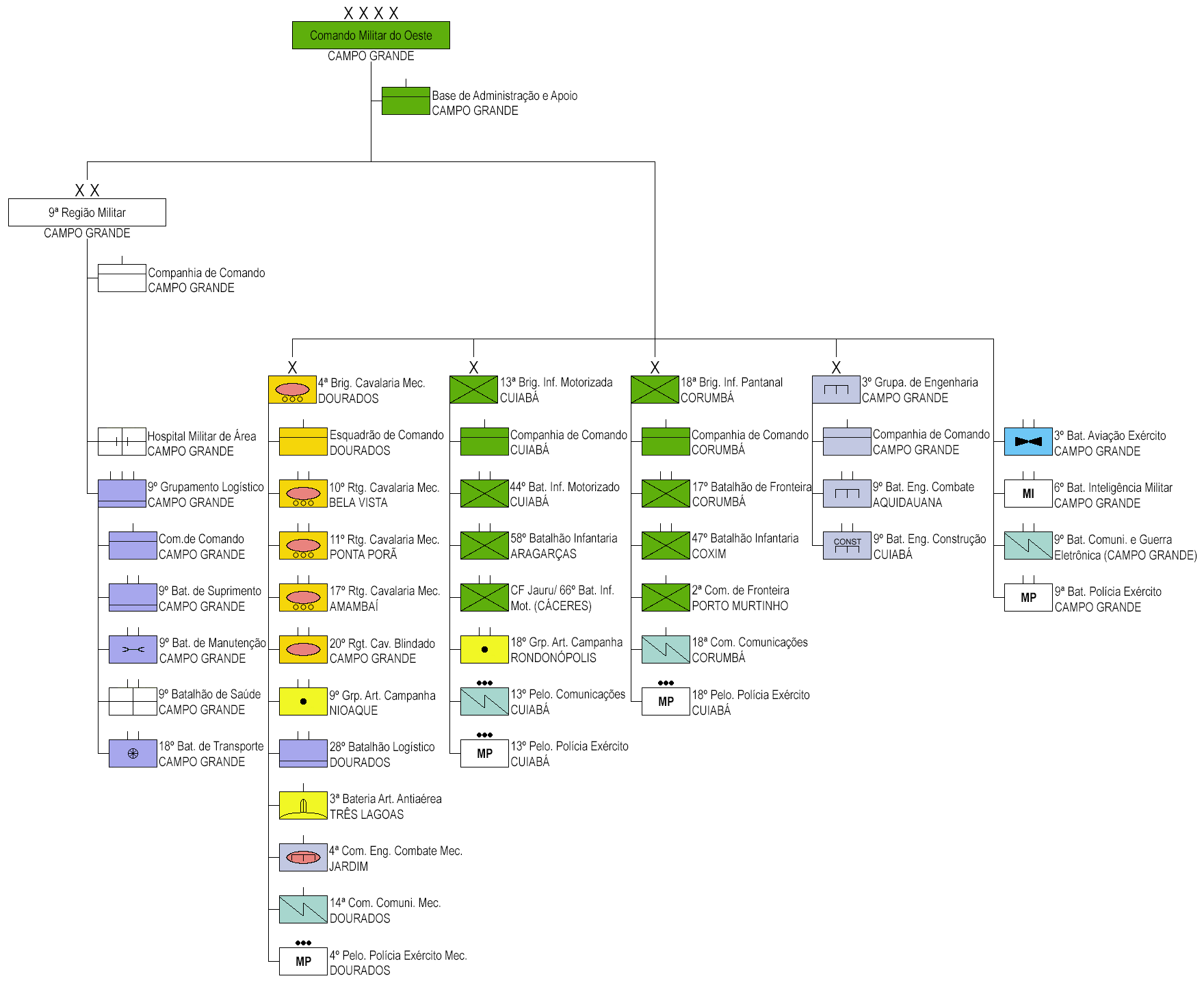
Structure of the Comando Militar do Oeste 2017 (click to enlarge)

- Western Military Command (Comando Militar do Oeste) - Campo Grande
  - HQ Company Western Military Command (Companhia de Comando do Comando Militar do Oeste) in Campo Grande
  - Administration and Support Base of the Western Military Command (Base de Administração e Apoio do Comando Militar do Oeste) in Campo Grande
  - 3rd Army Aviation Battalion (3º Batalhão de Aviação do Exército) in Campo Grande
  - 6th Military Intelligence Battalion (6º Batalhão de Inteligência) in Campo Grande
  - Betione Training Camp (Campo de Instrução de Betione), in Miranda
  - 9th Signals and Electronic Warfare Battalion (9º Batalhão de Comunicações e Guerra Eletrônica) in Campo Grande
  - 9th Military Police Battalion (9º Batalhão de Polícia do Exército) in Campo Grande
  - 9th Military Region (9ª Região Militar) in Campo Grande
    - HQ Company 9th Military Region (Companhia de Comando da 9ª Região Militar) in Campo Grande
    - Campo Grande Military Area Hospital (Hospital Militar de Área de Campo Grande) in Campo Grande
  - 9th Logistics Group (9º Grupamento Logístico) in Campo Grande
    - HQ Company 9th Logistics Group (Companhia de Comando do 9º Grupamento Logístico) in Campo Grande
    - 9th Supply Battalion (9º Batalhão de Suprimento) in Campo Grande
    - 18th Transport Battalion (18º Batalhão de Transporte) in Campo Grande
    - 9th Maintenance Battalion (9º Batalhão de Manutenção) in Campo Grande
    - 9th Medical Battalion (9º Batalhão de Saúde) in Campo Grande
  - 4th Mechanized Cavalry Brigade (4ª Brigada de Cavalaria Mecanizada) in Dourados
    - HQ Squadron 4th Mechanized Cavalry Brigade (Esquadrão de Comando da 4ª Brigada de Cavalaria Mecanizada) in Dourados
    - 10th Mechanized Cavalry Regiment (10º Regimento de Cavalaria Mecanizado) in Bela Vista
    - 11th Mechanized Cavalry Regiment (11º Regimento de Cavalaria Mecanizado) in Ponta Porã
    - 17th Mechanized Cavalry Regiment (17º Regimento de Cavalaria Mecanizado) in Amambaí
    - 20th Armored Cavalry Regiment (20º Regimento de Cavalaria Blindado) in Campo Grande
    - 9th Field Artillery Group (9º Grupo de Artilharia de Campanha) in Nioaque
    - 28th Logistics Battalion (28º Batalhão Logístico) in Dourados
    - 3rd Anti-air Artillery Battery (3ª Bateria de Artilharia Antiaérea) in Três Lagoas
    - 4th Mechanized Combat Engineer Company (4ª Companhia de Engenharia de Combate Mecanizada) in Jardim
    - 14th Mechanized Signals Company (14ª Companhia de Comunicações Mecanizada) in Dourados
    - 4th Military Police Platoon (4º Pelotão de Polícia do Exército) in Dourados
  - 13th Motorized Infantry Brigade (13ª Brigada de Infantaria Motorizada) in Cuiabá
    - HQ Company 13th Motorized Infantry Brigade (Companhia de Comando da 13ª Brigada de Infantaria Motorizada) in Cuiabá
    - 44th Motorized Infantry Battalion (44º Batalhão de Infantaria Motorizado) in Cuiabá
    - 58th Infantry Battalion (58º Batalhão de Infantaria) in Aragarças
    - Jauru Border Command/66th Motorized Infantry Battalion (Comando de Fronteira de Jauru/66º Batalhão de Infantaria Motorizado) in Cáceres
    - 18th Field Artillery Group (18º Grupo de Artilharia de Campanha) in Rondonópolis
    - 13th Signals Platoon (13° Pelotão de Comunicações)
    - 13th Military Police Platoon (13º Pelotão de Polícia do Exército) in Cuiabá
  - 18th Pantanal Infantry Brigade (13ª Brigada de Infantaria do Pantanal) in Corumbá
    - HQ Company 18th Pantanal Infantry Brigade (Companhia de Comando da 18ª Brigada de Infantaria do Pantanal) in Cuiabá
    - 17th Border Battalion (17º Batalhão de Fronteira) in Corumbá
    - 47th Infantry Battalion (47º Batalhão de Infantaria) in Coxim
    - 2nd Border Company (2ª Companhia de Fronteira) In Corumbá
    - 18th Signals Company (18ª Companhia de Comunicações), in Corumbá
    - 18th Military Police Platoon (13º Pelotão de Polícia do Exército) in Corumbá
  - 3rd Engineer Group (3º Grupamento de Engenharia) in Campo Grande
    - HQ Company 3rd Engineer Group (Companhia de Comando do 3º Grupamento de Engenharia) in Campo Grande
    - 9th Combat Engineer Battalion (9º Batalhão de Engenharia de Combate) in Aquidauana
    - 9th Construction Engineer Battalion (9º Batalhão de Engenharia de Construção) in Cuiabá
    - Regional Works Commission of the 9th Military Region (Comissão Regional de Obras da 9ª Região Militar)
