= Ladário =

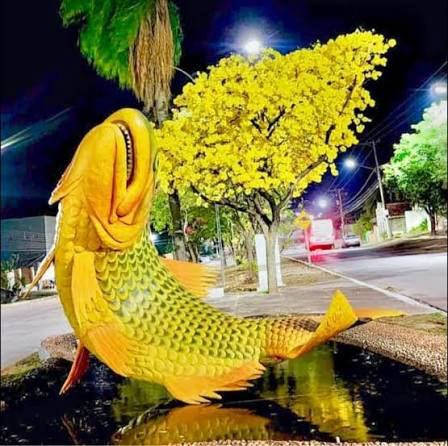
- Avenida 14 de Março (14th of March Avenue)

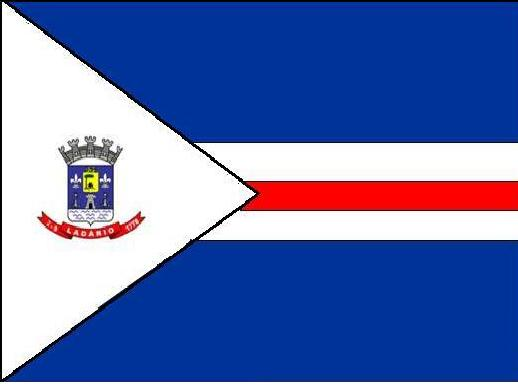
- Flag

- Location of Ladário in Mato Grosso do Sul and Brazil
- Coordinates: 19°00′18″S 57°36′07″W
- Country: Brazil
- State: Mato Grosso do Sul
- Region: Center-West
- Macroregion: Pantanais Sul-Mato-Grossenses
- Microregion: Baixo Pantanal

Government
  - Mayor: José Antônio Assad e Faria

Area
  - Total: 342.5 km^{2} (132.2 sq mi)
- Elevation: 114 m (374 ft)

Population (2026)
  - Total: 24,631
  - Density: 71.92/km^{2} (186.3/sq mi)
- Time zone: UTC−4 (AMT)

Ladário (Portuguese pronunciation: [laˈdaɾju]) is a municipality located in the Brazilian state of Mato Grosso do Sul. The municipality of Ladário is surrounded by the municipality of Corumbá in all directions. Together, Corumbá and Ladário total 120,965 inhabitants.

A town with natural resources such as iron, manganese, limestone, sand and clay, Ladário is located in the western region of the state of Mato Grosso do Sul, in the heart of the Pantanal.

== See also ==
- List of municipalities in Mato Grosso do Sul
