= Bela Vista, Mato Grosso do Sul =

Bela Vista
- Municipality
- Municipality of Bela Vista
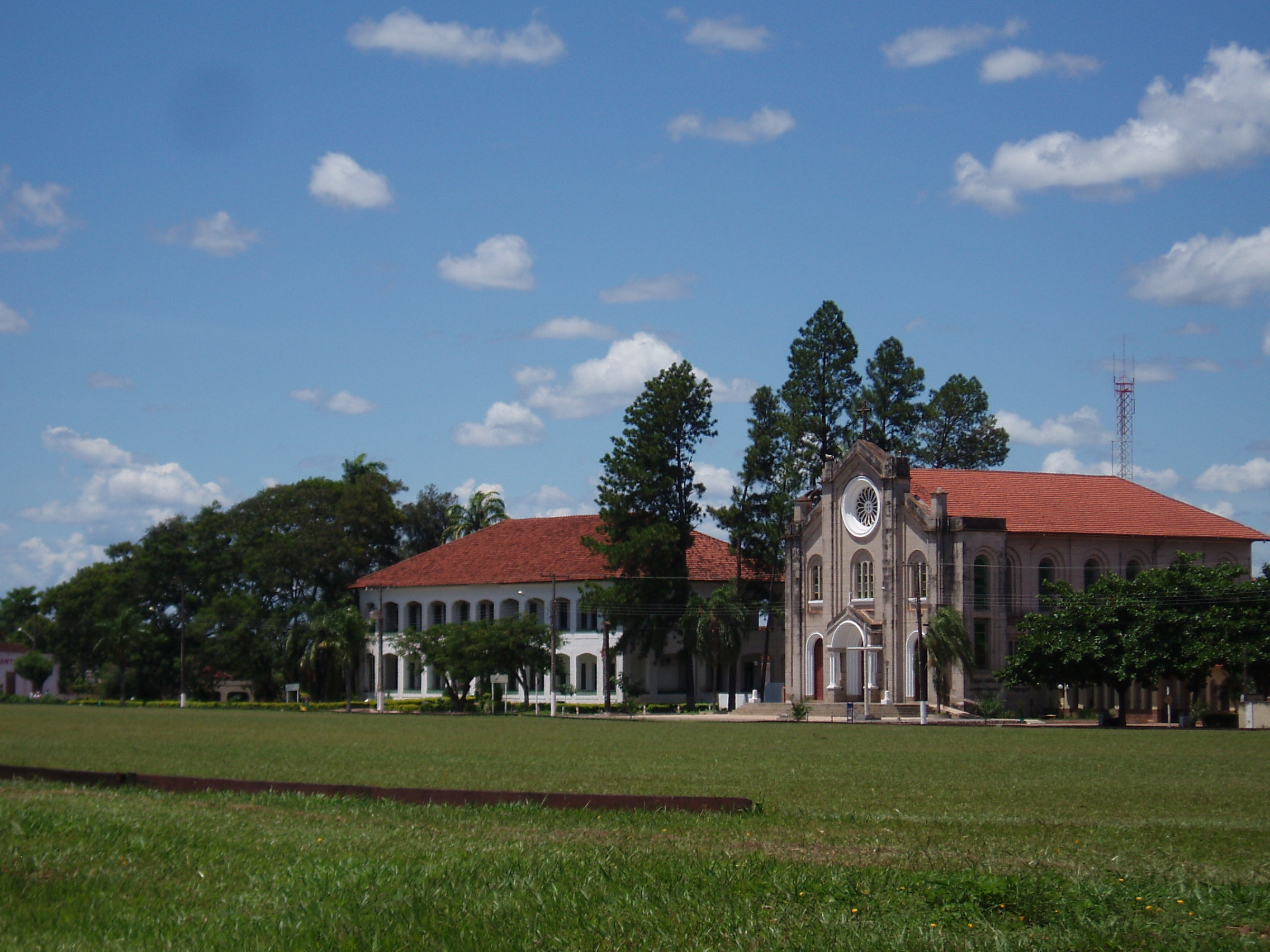

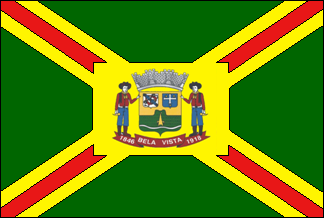
- Flag

- Location in Mato Grosso do Sul
- Coordinates: 22°06′32″S 56°31′15″W
- Country: Brazil
- Region: Central-West
- State: Mato Grosso do Sul
- Founded: 10 April 1900

Government
  - Mayor: Gabriel Gerardo Boccia (PP)

Area
  - Total: 4,899.440 km^{2} (1,891.684 sq mi)
- Elevation: 197 m (646 ft)

Population (2022)
  - Total: 21,613
  - Density: 4.4113/km^{2} (11.425/sq mi)
- Demonym: bela-vistense
- Time zone: UTC−4 (BRT)
- Postal Code: 79260-000 to 79269-999
- Area code: +55 67
- HDI (2010): 0.698 – medium
- Major airport: Bela Vista Airport
- Website: belavista.ms.gov.br

Bela Vista is a municipality located in the Brazilian state of Mato Grosso do Sul. Its population was 24,735 (2020) and its area is 4,946 km^{2}.
