= Miranda, Mato Grosso do Sul =

Coordinates: 20°14′27″S 56°22′40″W

Município de Miranda
- Municipality
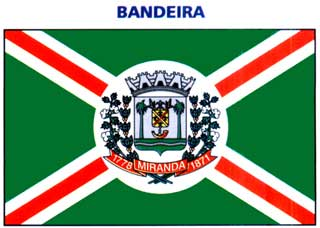
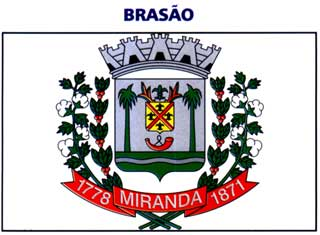
- Flag Coat of arms

- Location in Brazil
- Country: Brazil
- Region: Center-West
- State: Mato Grosso do Sul
- Founded: July 16, 1784

Government
  - Mayor: Elisabeth de Paula Almeida

Area
  - Total: 5,478.63 km^{2} (2,115.31 sq mi)
- Elevation: 125 m (410 ft)

Population (2020)
  - Total: 28,220
  - Density: 4.2/km^{2} (11/sq mi)
- Time zone: UTC−4 (AMT)
- HDI (2000): 0.724 – medium

Miranda is a municipality located in the Brazilian state of Mato Grosso do Sul, Brazil, named for its location on the river by the same name. Its population was 28,220 in 2020 and its area is 5,479 km^{2}.
