= Carretão =

Carretão is a quilombo remnant community, a traditional Brazilian population, located in the Brazilian municipality of Poconé, in Mato Grosso. The Carretão community is made up of 3 families, whose ancestors settled in the area more than 200 years ago. The territory was certified as a quilombo remnant (historical remnants of former quilombos) by the Palmares Cultural Foundation, by Ordinance No. 279/2017.

Despite the certification, one of the quilombola families was evicted by Judge Kátia Rodrigues Oliveira, of the local Single Court, in favor of two farmers who claim ownership of the territory occupied by the family, João José dos Santos Neto and Alaerce José dos Santos.

== Listing ==
The listing of quilombos as protected heritage sites is provided for by the Brazilian Constitution of 1988, requiring only certification by the Palmares Cultural Foundation:

Article 216. The following constitute Brazilian cultural heritage: tangible and intangible assets, considered individually or collectively, that are bearers of reference to the identity, actions, and memory of the different groups that make up Brazilian society [...] § 5. All documents and sites containing historical remnants of the former quilombos are hereby declared protected.

== Territorial situation ==
The lack of land title (land regularization) creates difficulties for the community in developing agriculture, in addition to conflicts with two brothers who are farmers and arrived in the region a few years ago, cutting down the forests and threatening the residents to leave the land.

Traditional Peoples or Traditional Communities are groups that have a culture distinct from the predominant local culture, maintaining a way of life closely linked to the natural environment in which they live. Through their own forms of social organization, use of territory and natural resources (with a subsistence relationship), their socio-cultural-religious reproduction utilizes knowledge transmitted orally and in daily practice.
