= Taiamã Ecological Station =

Protected area in Mato Grosso, Brazil

- Estação Ecológica de Taiamã
- IUCN category Ia (strict nature reserve)
- Location within Brazil
- Location: Cáceres, Mato Grosso, Brazil
- Coordinates: 16°51′11″S 57°30′18″W
- Area: 11,555 hectares (28,550 acres)
- Designation: Ecological station
- Created: 2 June 1981

Ramsar Wetland
- Designated: 21 October 2018
- Reference no.: 2363

Taiamã Ecological Station (Portuguese: Estação Ecológica de Taiamã) is an ecological station in the Mato Grosso state of Brazil.

== Creation ==
In the 1970s the Special Secretariat of the Environment under the environmentalist Paulo Nogueira Neto launched a program of estações ecológicas (ecological stations) with the aim of establishing a network of reserves that would protect representative samples of all Brazilian ecosystems. Several stations were created in 1981, of which the Taiamã Ecological Station was the only one in the Pantanal, (Note: The Pantanal is one of the largest wetland areas in the world, with an area of almost 600,000 square kilometres (230,000 sq mi) in the upper Paraguay River basin, of which 363,000 square kilometres (140,000 sq mi) is in Brazil.) created by decree on 2 June 1981.

The Taiamã Ecological Station is in the Cáceres and Poconé municipalities of Mato Grosso. It consists of the island of Taiamã, which covers a total area of 11,555 hectares (28,550 acres) and is bordered by the Paraguay and Bracinho rivers. The purpose is to preserve nature and support scientific research.

== Environment ==
The station consists mostly of flooded fields, but includes permanent and temporary lakes, ponds and meandering streams, strongly influenced by seasonal fluctuations of the Paraguay River.

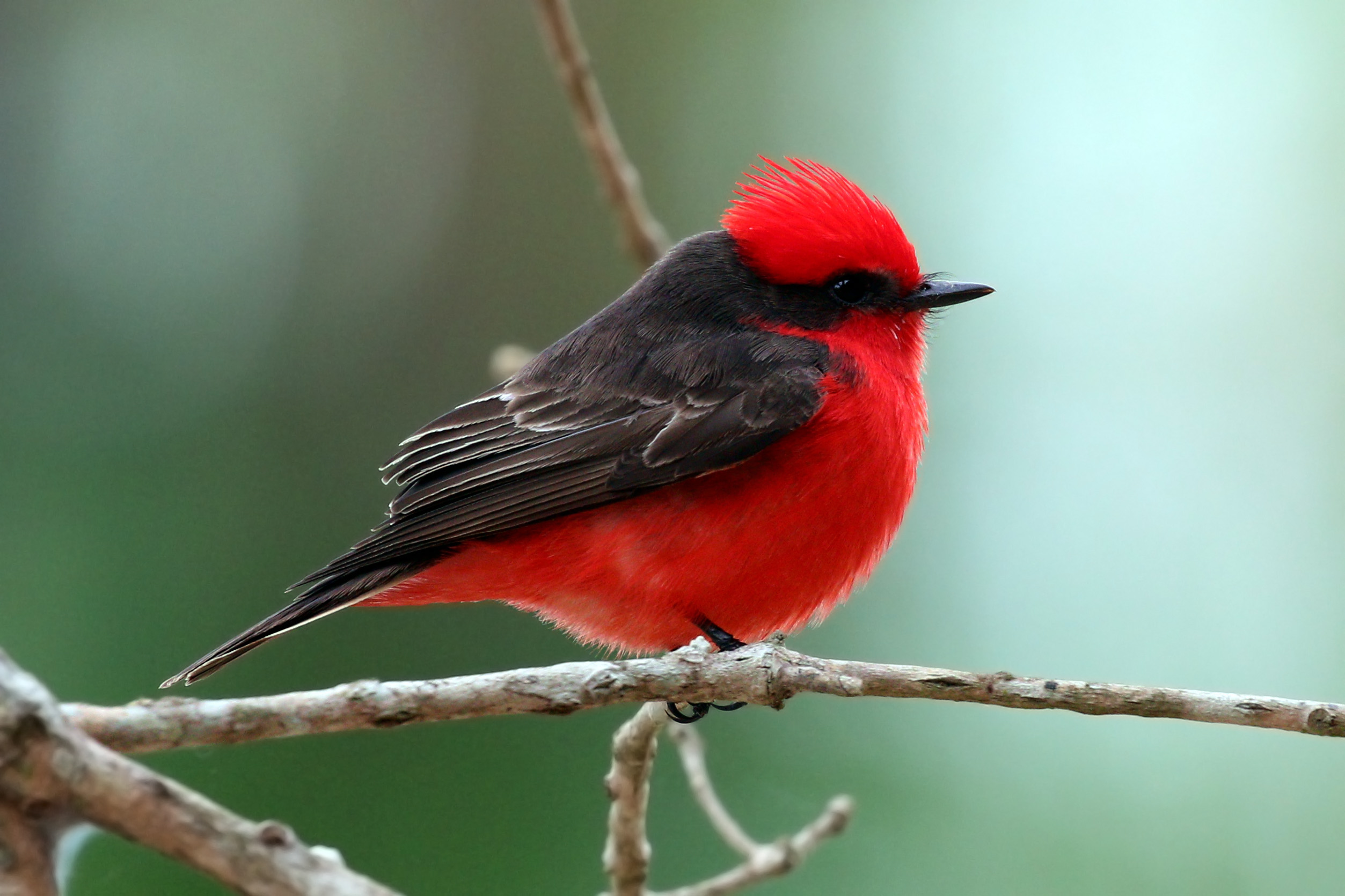
Vermilion flycatcher in the Pantanal

The vegetation of the Pantanal is mainly influenced by the Cerrado biome, but also has elements from the Amazon rainforest, Gran Chaco and Atlantic Forest. There are large fields of grass interspersed with areas of forest, and riparian forest along the rivers around the station. Water plants such as water hyacinth (eichhornia crassipes) provide shelter for fish to lay their eggs. Islands of water hyacinth floating down river during floods transport many animal and plant species. The region is notable for its extraordinary concentration and abundance of wildlife. Migratory birds include vermilion flycatcher (pyrocephalus rubinus), American cliff swallow (hirundo pyrrhonota), barn swallow (hirundo rustica) and purple martin (progne subis).

== Status ==
As of 2009 the Ecological Station was a "strict nature reserve" under IUCN protected area category Ia, with a terrestrial area of 11,200 hectares (28,000 acres). Endangered species in the ecological station include the jaguar (Panthera onca), giant otter (Pteronura brasiliensis) and marsh deer (Blastocerus dichotomus). Since 2018 the station has been designated as a protected Ramsar site.

== Sources ==
- Estação Ecológica de Taiamã: História (in Portuguese), ICMBio
- Triana, Elisa (29 May 2009), "Strict Nature Reserves in Brazil", The Encyclopedia of Earth
- Unidade de Conservação: Estação Ecológica de Taiamã (in Portuguese), MMA: Ministério do Meio Ambiente
