= Antônio João Ribeiro =

Antônio João
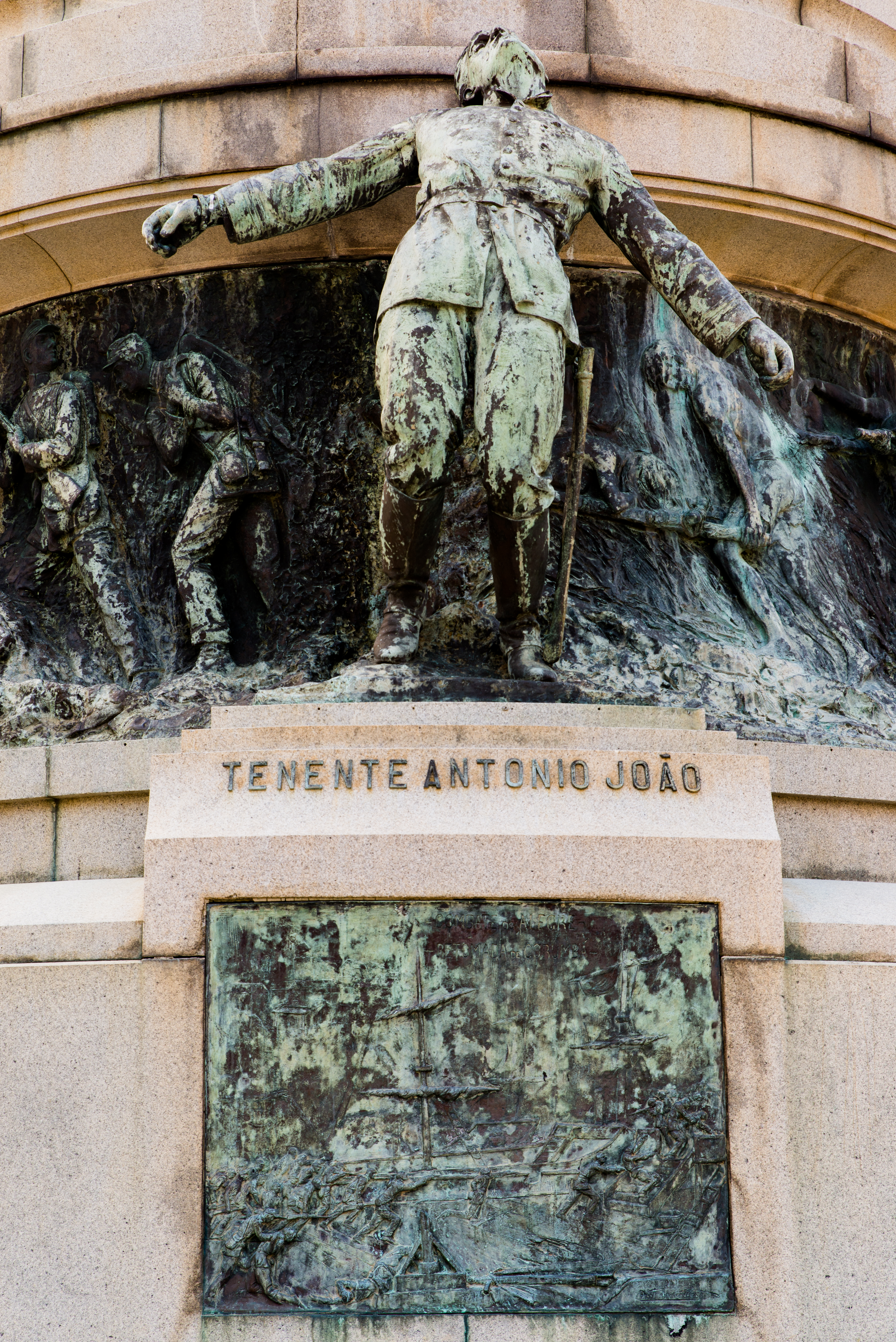
- Antônio João in the Monument to the Heroes of Laguna and Dourados
- Born: 24 December 1823; Poconé, Mato Grosso, Brazil
- Died: 29 December 1864 (aged 41) Antônio João, Mato Grosso, Brazil
- Allegiance: Brazil
- Branch: Imperial Brazilian Army
- Service years: 1841–1864
- Rank: Second lieutenant
- Conflicts: Paraguayan War; Battle for Colônia Militar dos Dourados †

Antônio João Ribeiro (24 December 1823 – 29 December 1864) was a Brazilian lieutenant who served in the Paraguayan War and was notable for his sacrifice in the Battle for Colônia Militar dos Dourados.

== Military career ==
He was the son of Manoel Ribeiro de Brito and Rita de Campos Maciel, he joined the Imperial Brazilian Army as a volunteer soldier in 1841 in 12th Caçadores Battalion, where he was promoted to corporal and sergeant. As a result of his professional performance, character and dedication, he was promoted to lieutenant, in 1852, and to second lieutenant, with honors, in 1860, thus reaching officership and being appointed commander of the Military Colony of Dourados, in the then Province of Mato Grosso. The Military Colony of Dourados was not located in the city of Dourados, but where the city of Antônio João is today.

In December 1864, as a lieutenant of the cavalry weapon, at the head of a small force of 15 men, he led the defense of the province against the Paraguayan invasion, in a number many times greater, under the command of Major Martín Urbieta. When he learned of the enemy's approach, he had the civilians evacuated and resisted until he succumbed in combat, defeated by the Paraguayan rifles. Before dying, he sent the following message to his commander, which became famous: "I know that I am dying, but my blood and that of my companions will serve as a solemn protest against the invasion of the soil of my Homeland."

== Legacy ==
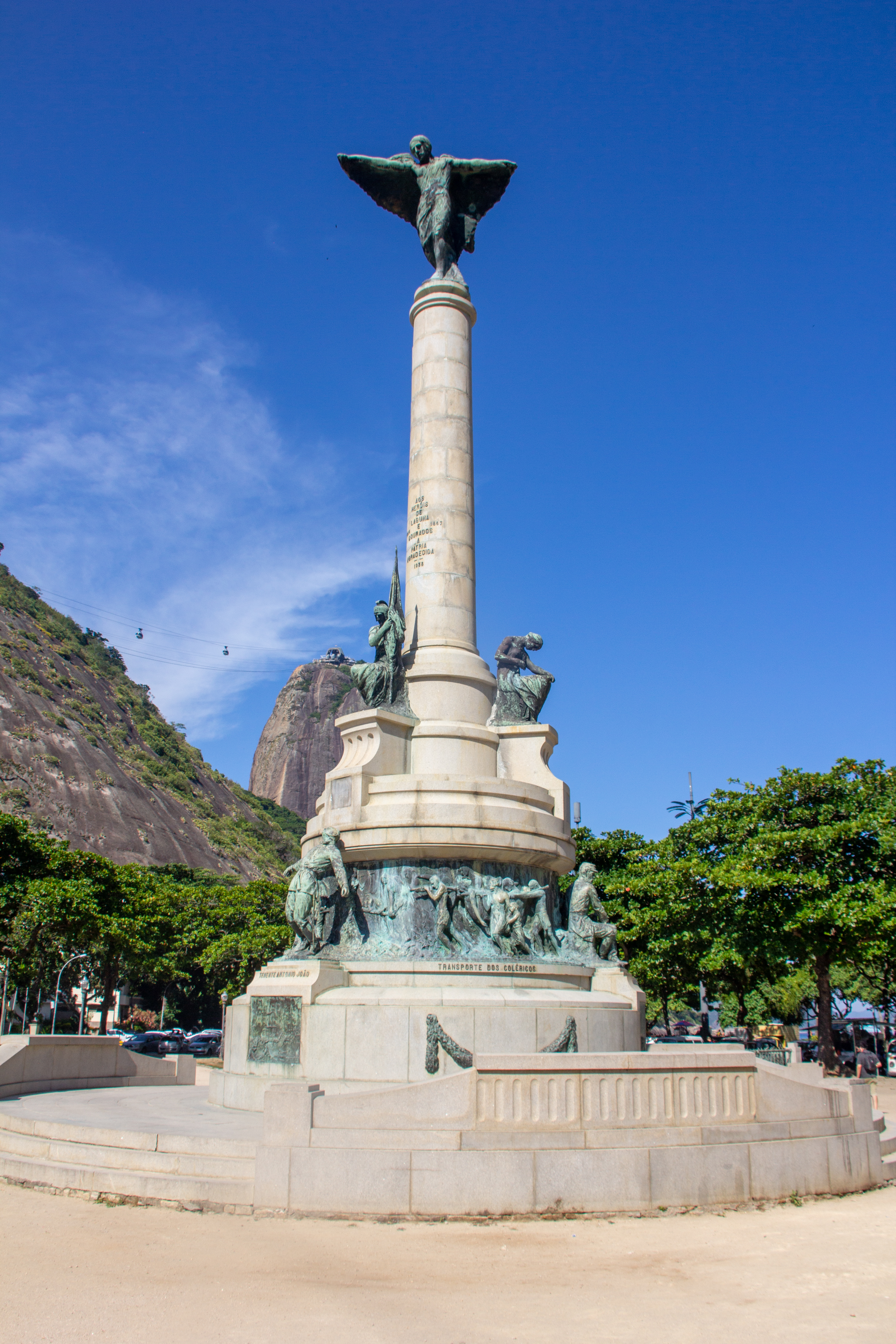
Monument to the Heroes of Laguna and Dourados, in Rio de Janeiro

In his honor, a statue commemorating this heroic act was erected at Urca, Rio de Janeiro.

Antônio João was also honored in the main square of Dourados and was mentioned in the anthem of Mato Grosso do Sul and also takes his name from the city where he died.

Antônio João bravely honored the Imperial Army Officer Corps and due to the example of commitment to the Homeland, demonstration of bravery, moral grandeur and detachment with his own life, he was chosen by the Institution, through Decree No. 85,091, of 24 August 1980, as the Patron of the Auxiliary Staff of Officers (QAO) of the Brazilian Army.

The group of Sergeants of the Brazilian Army formed in 1991 is named TURMA TENENTE ANTÔNIO JOÃO, in honor of the distinguished patron of the QAO.
