= Paulo Nogueira Neto =

Brazilian environmentalist (1922–2019)

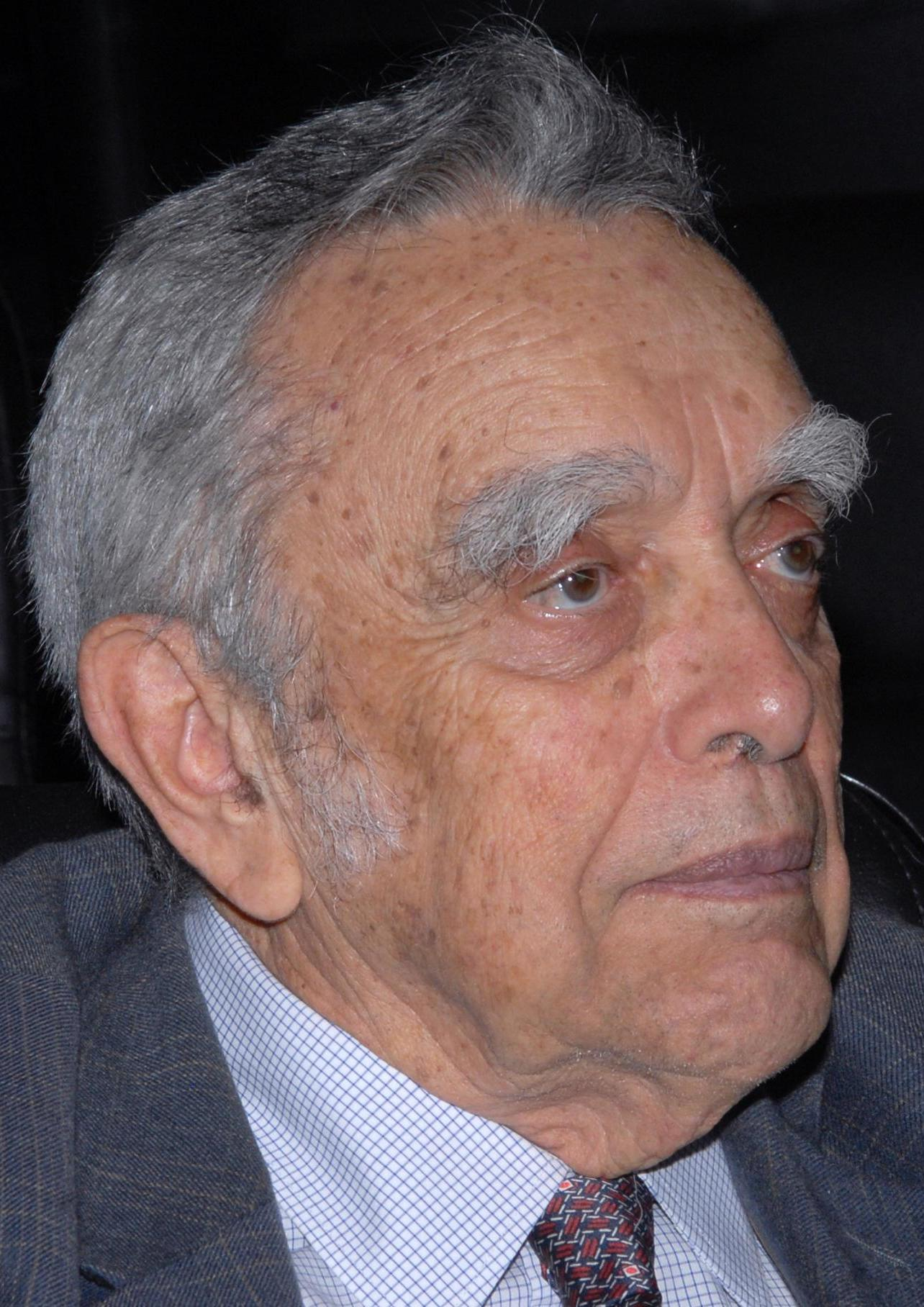
- Paulo Nogueira Neto at the ECO World Conference 2008

Secretary of the Environment
- In office 1974–1986
- Succeeded by: Roberto Messias Franco

Personal details
- Born: 18 April 1922 São Paulo, Brazil
- Died: 25 February 2019 (aged 96) São Paulo, Brazil
- Occupation: Environmentalist
- Known for: National Environmental Policy Law 6.938/81

Paulo Nogueira Neto (18 April 1922 – 25 February 2019) was a Brazilian environmentalist. He headed the first federal environmental agency in Brazil, the forerunner of today's Ministry of the Environment, and was a member of the United Nations Brundtland Commission on the Environment and Development. He had a major influence on Brazil's environmental legislation.

== Early years ==
Paulo Nogueira Neto was born in São Paulo on 18 April 1922. He came from a prominent family that included the Italian naturalist Domenico Vandelli (1735–1816), the independence leader José Bonifácio de Andrada (1763–1838), and the fourth president of Brazil, Manuel Ferraz de Campos Sales (1841–1913). His parents were Paulo Nogueira Filho and Regina Coutinho Nogueira. His younger brother was José Bonifácio Coutinho Nogueira, who became Secretary of Agriculture (1959–1963) under São Paulo Governor Carvalho Pinto.

Nogueira Neto attended the São Bento Gymnasium in São Paulo for his secondary education. His family owned a farm in Campinas. They were friends of several proprietors in the area, including Manoel Ribeiro do Valle, who raised stingless bees and became Nogueira Neto's father-in-law. Nogueira Neto enlisted as a volunteer in the cavalry during World War II (1939–45), but was not required to serve overseas. In 1944 he married Lucia Ribeiro do Valle. They had three children, Paulo Júnior, Luiz Antônio, and Eduardo Manoel. In 1945 he graduated from the Faculty of Law of the University of São Paulo (USP) with a degree in Legal and Social Sciences.

== Biologist ==
In 1954 Paulo Nogueira Neto founded the Association for the Defense of the Environment (ADEMA-SP: Associação de Defesa do Meio Ambiente), one of the first environmental organizations in Brazil. He returned to the USP to study Natural History, and in 1963 defended his doctoral thesis on the architecture of bees' nests. He became a teacher in USP's Department of Zoology. In the late 1960s he led a group of about 30 professionals at the Paulista Association of Biologists (APAB) who agitated for the creation of the Federal Biology Council (CFBio). He became the council's first president. Nogueira Neto became a specialist in animal behavior, terrestrial ecosystems and climate change. He helped create the Department of General Ecology at the USP Institute of Biosciences.

== Secretariat for the Environment ==
In 1974 Paulo Nogueira Neto was appointed head of the Special Secretariat for the Environment (SEMA), and held this position in successive governments for twelve and a half years. This was the first federal environmental agency in Brazil. SEMA was a unit of the Ministry of the Interior, with less than 1% of the ministry's budget. (Note: Later SEMA became an agency of the Ministry of Environment and Housing.) Nogueira Neto recalled that at first he had five employees and three rooms to solve the environment problems of the whole of Brazil. He was twice asked to join the government party but refused to become involved in politics. Nogueira Neto was the architect of basic environmental legislation that received almost unanimous approval from both the government and the opposition. He was the architect of the National Environmental Policy Law 6.938 of 31 August 1981, which established the administrative, legal and technical foundations for the federal Ministry of the Environment (MMA).

SEMA began a program of ecological stations (ESECs), a category that was formally defined by law 6.902 of 27 April 1981. Creation of these units was defined as a specific objective in the National Environmental Policy Law. The objective was to establish a network of reserves in federal, state or municipal area that would preserve representative samples of all the ecosystems in Brazil. Seven areas in the Amazon were chosen but only one, the Taiamã Ecological Station, was in the Pantanal biome. During Nogueira Neto's administration a total of 3,000,000 hectares (7,400,000 acres) of ecological stations and ecological reserves were created, as well as 1,500,000 hectares (3,700,000 acres) of environmental protection areas. He also founded and was the first president of the National Environment Council (CONAMA), and was secretary of the environment of the Government of the Federal District.

== Later career ==
Paulo Nogueira Neto was a member of the United Nations Brundtland Commission on the Environment and Development, headed by Gro Harlem Brundtland of Norway, from 1984 to 1987. At one time the commission went to visit the Amazon a few days after the governor of Amazonas, Gilberto Mestrinho, had said it was sheer nonsense to try to protect the forests, which would not be exhausted in 1,000 years. Some of the members refused to go to the official dinner, but Nogueira Neto managed to calm things down, and the dinner was a success. When he joined the Brundtland Commission the key environmental problem appeared to be human population growth, which based on trends at the time could double the world's population in 36 years. Population explosion was due to poverty, and the commission saw that "sustainable economic development" was the solution, a term that has since become commonplace.

Nogueira Neto was twice elected vice president of the Man and the Biosphere Program of the United Nations Educational, Scientific and Cultural Organization (UNESCO). He was vice president of the SOS Mata Atlântica Foundation and of WWF-Brazil. In 2010, at the age of 88, he was emeritus professor at the Institute of Biology, University of São Paulo, member of the Technical Chamber of Conservation Units of CONAMA (National Environment Council) and president of the Forest Foundation of the State of São Paulo. In a 2010 interview he was generally optimistic, although he still saw serious problems such as deforestation in Minas Gerais.

Nogueira Neto received many awards including the Order of the Southern Cross, the Order of Ipiranga, Commander of the Order of Rio Branco, the Fritz Müller Prize, the J. Paul Getty Wildlife Conservation Prize and the Duke of Edinburgh Conservation Award of the World Wide Fund for Nature. In November 2008 he was awarded the Rocha Lima Medal at the 12th annual meeting of the Biological Institute in São Paulo. He died on 25 February 2019 in São Paulo at the age of 96.

== Publications ==
Nogueira Neto's publications include:

- Paulo Nogueira Neto (1970), Animais Alienigenas – Gado Tropical – Areas Naturais e Outros Assuntos, Editora Tecnapis, p. 256
- Paulo Nogueira Neto (1973), A Criação de Animais Indígenas Vertebrados, Sāo Paulo: Edições Tecnapis
- Paulo Nogueira Neto (1984), O Comportamento Animal e as Raízes do Comportamento Humano, Editora Tecnapis, p. 230
- Paulo Nogueira Neto (1990), Mar de Dentro, Araquém Alcântara, photographs, Empresa das Artes
- Paulo Nogueira Neto; Alex Soletto (1993), Do Taim ao Chuí: Da Barra do Rio Grande as Terras e Águas do Arroio Chuí
- Paulo Nogueira Neto (1991), Estações Ecológicas – uma Saga de Ecologia e de Política Ambiental, Empresa das Artes, p. 103
  - Paulo Nogueira Neto (1992), Ecological Stations, Dba
- Paulo Nogueira Neto (2010), Uma Trajetória Ambientalista, Empresa Das Artes

== Sources ==
- "Ambientalista Paulo Nogueira-Neto morre aos 96 anos". Globo1 (in Brazilian Portuguese). 25 February 2019.
- Camara, Bernardo (25 January 2011), "Diários do pioneiro Paulo Nogueira Neto", O Eco (in Portuguese)
- "Confira os 43 livros encontrados para Paulo Nogueira Neto", Estantevirtual.com.br (in Portuguese)
- "Donos da EPTV controlam usina que tenta despejar assentamento". Repórter Brasil (in Brazilian Portuguese). 23 January 2013.
- Estação Ecológica de Taiamã: História (in Portuguese), ICMBio, archived from the original on 2016-06-10
- "Morre ambientalista Paulo Nogueira-Neto aos 96 anos" (in Portuguese). 25 February 2019.
- "Morre Paulo Nogueira Neto, criador da política ambiental brasileira". Folha de S.Paulo (in Brazilian Portuguese). 25 February 2019.
- Paulo Nogueira Neto ganha Medalha Rocha Lima, Agência FAPESP, 3 October 2008
- Prado, Thays; Nunes, Mônica (4 June 2010), "Paulo Nogueira Neto: otimismo ambiental moderado", Planeta Sustentável (in Portuguese), archived from the original on 8 June 2010
- Salera, Giovanni Júnior (February 2016), "Paulo Nogueira Neto – O Maior Ambientalista do Brasil", Recanto das Letras (in Portuguese), Palmas - TO
