= Battle for Colônia Militar dos Dourados =

1864 attack by Paraguayan soldiers in Brazil

Battle of Dourados
- Part of the Mato Grosso campaign
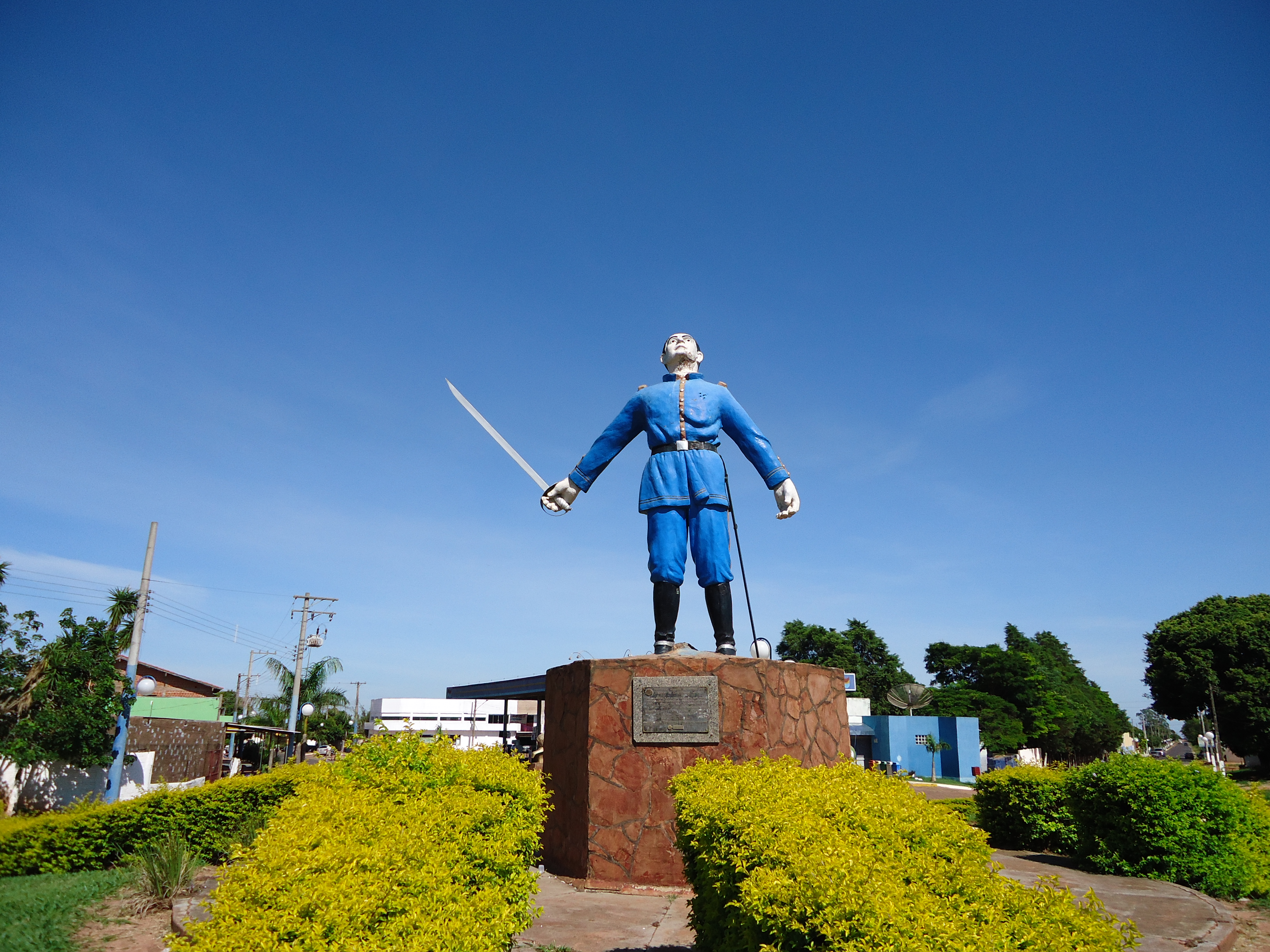
- Statue of Lieutenant Antonio João Ribeiro
Date	29 December 1864
Location	Maracaju Mountain Range, Mato Grosso do Sul, Brazil
Result	Paraguayan victory
Territorial changes	Occupation of the Military Colony of Dourados

Belligerents
Paraguay	Empire of Brazil

Commanders and leaders
Francisco Isidoro Resquín; Manoel Martinez Urbieta	Antônio João Ribeiro †

Strength
3,500 soldiers	16 soldiers

Casualties and losses
Unknown	16 killed

The Combat of Dourados, also known as the Combat of the Military Colony of Dourados, or the Battle of Dourados, was a confrontation between a Brazilian garrison of fifteen men and a Paraguayan column with 3,500 soldiers, fought on 29 December 1864, in the current city of Antônio João, Mato Grosso do Sul, during the Paraguayan War. In the context of the Mato Grosso campaign, the Paraguayan invading army reached the Military Colony of Dourados, in the south of the then Province of Mato Grosso. There was a small garrison defending it, under the command of Lieutenant Antônio João Ribeiro.

The Paraguayans supposedly offered the garrison the opportunity to surrender, however, the Brazilian commander refused the proposal. In the combat that then ensued, the lieutenant and all his 15 men were killed, with the Paraguayans occupying the military colony.
