= Pantanal =

Tropical wetland in Brazil, Bolivia and Paraguay

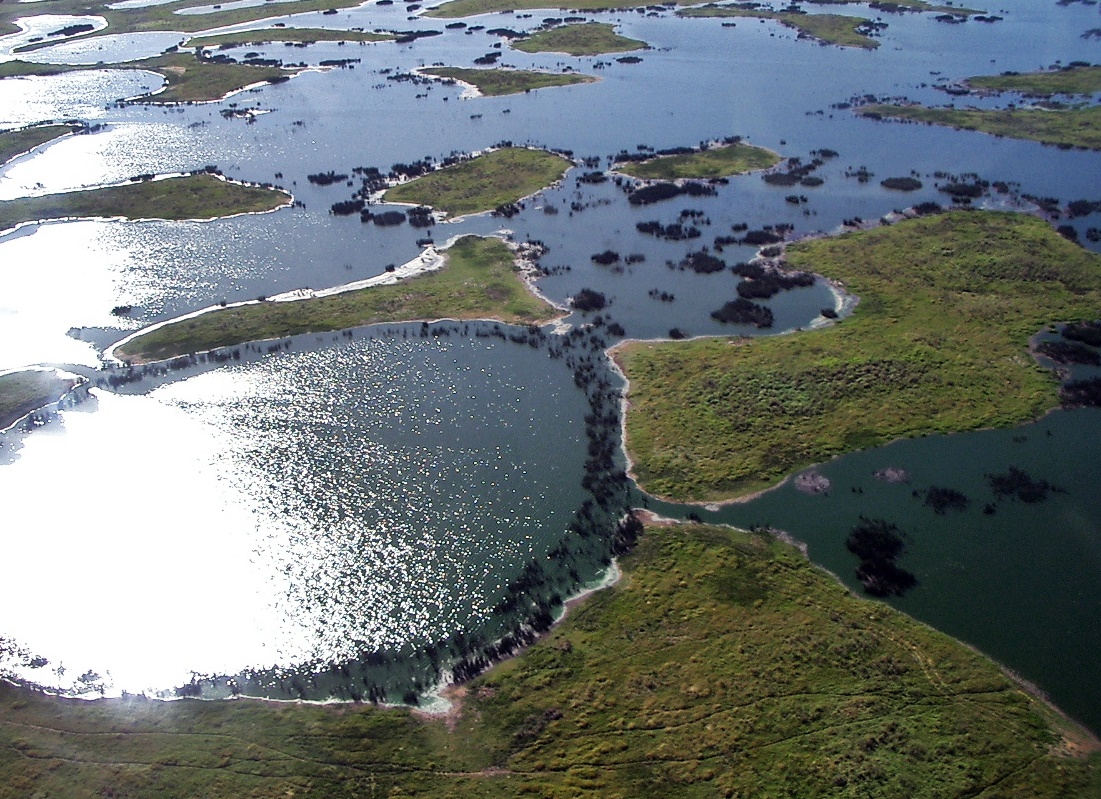
- Pantanal scenery

- Map of the Pantanal ecoregion

Ecology
- Realm: Neotropical
- Biome: Flooded grasslands and savannas

Geography
- Area: 195,000 km^{2} (75,000 mi^{2})
- Countries: Brazil; Bolivia; Paraguay

Conservation
- Global 200: Pantanal flooded savannas
- Location within Brazil Location within South America

UNESCO World Heritage Site
- Location: Brazil, Bolivia, Paraguay
- Criteria: Natural: (vii), (ix), (x)
- Reference: 999
- Inscription: 2000 (24th Session)
- Area: 187,818 ha (464,110 acres)
- Coordinates: 17°24′S 57°30′W

Ramsar Wetland
- Official name: Pantanal Matogrossense
- Designated: 24 May 1993
- Reference no.: 602

Ramsar Wetland
- Official name: El Pantanal Boliviano
- Designated: 17 September 2001
- Reference no.: 1089

The Pantanal (Portuguese pronunciation: [pɐ̃taˈnaw], Spanish pronunciation: [pantaˈnal]) is a natural region encompassing the world's largest tropical wetland area, and the world's largest flooded grasslands. It is located mostly within the Brazilian state of Mato Grosso do Sul, but it extends into Mato Grosso and portions of Bolivia and Paraguay. It sprawls over an area estimated at between 140,000 and 195,000 km^{2} (54,000 and 75,000 sq mi). Various subregional ecosystems exist, each with distinct hydrological, geological, and ecological characteristics; up to 12 of them have been defined.

Roughly 80% of the Pantanal floodplains are submerged during the rainy seasons, nurturing a biologically diverse collection of aquatic plants and helping to support a dense array of animal species.

== Etymology ==
The name "Pantanal" comes from the Portuguese word pântano and the Spanish word pantano that mean "swamp", "wetland", "bog", "quagmire", or "marsh" plus the suffix -al, that means "abundance, agglomeration, collection".

== Geography and geology ==
The Pantanal covers about 140,000–160,000 km^{2} (54,000–62,000 sq mi) of gently sloped basin that receives runoff from the upland areas (the Planalto highlands) and slowly releases the water through the Paraguay River and tributaries. The formation is a result of the large, concave, pre-Andean depression of the Earth's crust, related to the Andean orogeny of the Tertiary. It constitutes an enormous internal river delta, in which several rivers flowing from the surrounding plateau merge, depositing their sediments and erosion residues, which have been filling the large depression area of the Pantanal. This area is also one of the distinct physiographic provinces of the larger Parana-Paraguay Plain area, which encompasses a total of 1.5×10^{6} km^{2} (580,000 sq mi).

The Pantanal is bounded by the Chiquitano dry forests to the west and northwest, by the Arid Chaco dry forests to the southwest, and the Humid Chaco to the south. The Cerrado savannas lie to the north, east, and southeast.

=== Climate ===
The Pantanal is a tropical wet and dry region with an average annual temperature of 24 °C (75 °F) and rainfall between 1,000 and 1,250 millimetres (39 and 49 in) per year. Extreme temperatures can reach a high of 41 °C (106 °F) or drop to −1 °C (30 °F). Throughout the year, temperature varies about 6.0 °C (10.8 °F) with the warmest month being November (with an average temperature of 26 °C or 79 °F) and the coldest month being June (with an average temperature of 20 °C or 68 °F). Its wettest month is January (with an average of 340 mm or 13 in) and its driest is June (with an average of 3 mm or 0.12 in).

=== Hydrodynamics ===
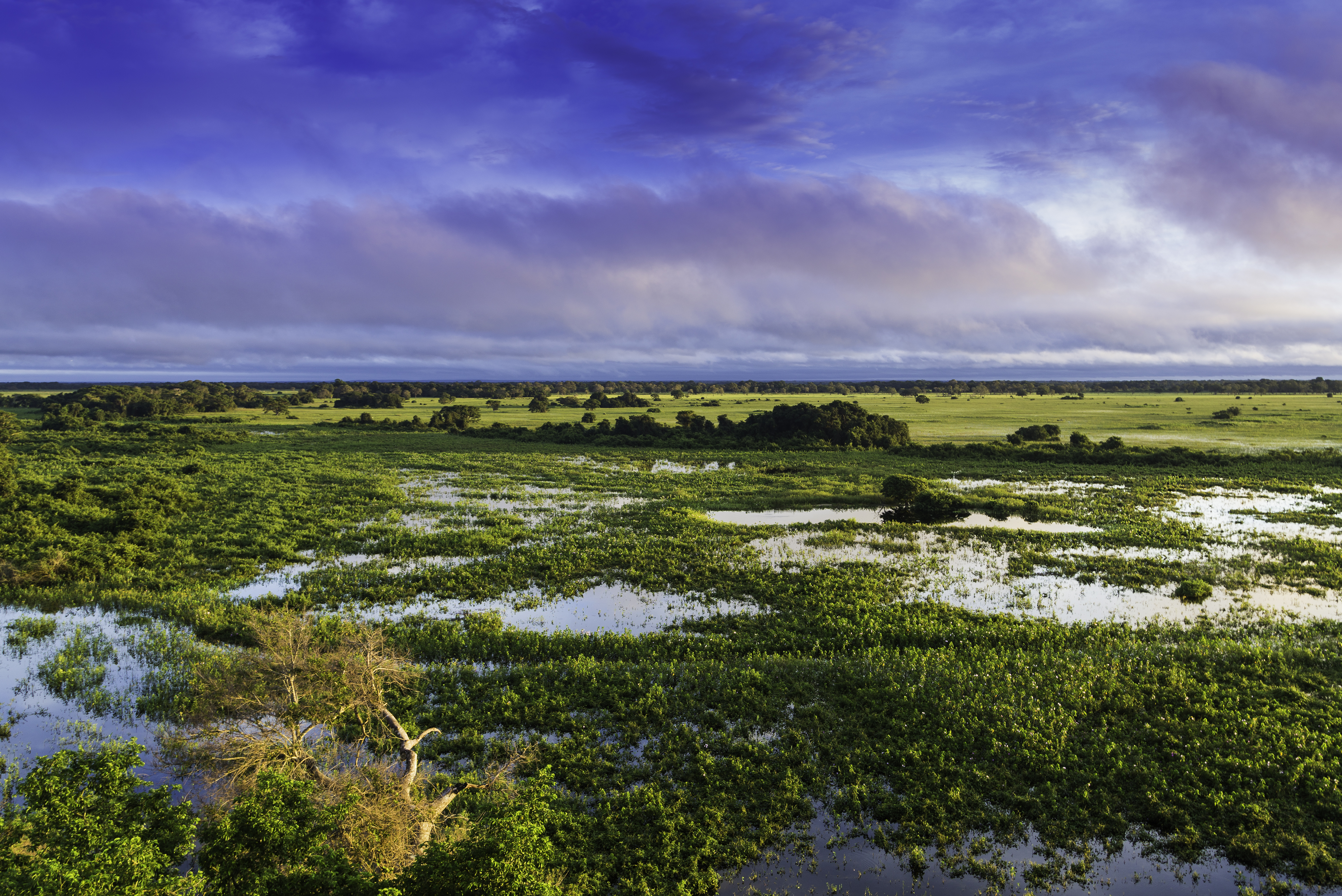
Landscape

Floodplain ecosystems such as the Pantanal are defined by their seasonal inundation and desiccation. They shift between phases of standing water and phases of dry soil, when the water table can be well below the root region. Soils range from high levels of sand in higher areas to higher amounts of clay and silt in riverine areas.

Elevation of the Pantanal ranges from 80 to 150 m (260 to 490 ft) above sea level. Annual rainfall over the flood basin is between 1,000 and 1,500 mm (39 and 59 in), with most rainfall occurring between November and March. Annual average precipitation ranged from 920 to 1,540 mm in the years 1968–2000. In the Paraguay River portion of the Pantanal, water levels rise between two meters to five meters seasonally; water fluctuations in other parts of the Pantanal are less than this. Flood waters tend to flow slowly (2 to 10 cm (0.79 to 3.94 in) per second) due to the low gradients and high resistance offered by the dense vegetation.

When rising river waters first contact previously dry soil, the waters become oxygen-depleted, rendering the water environs anoxic. Many natural fish kills can occur if there are no oxygenated water refuges available. The reason for this remains speculative: it may be due to the growth of toxin-producing bacteria in the deoxygenated water rather than as a direct result of lack of oxygen.

== Flora ==
The vegetation of the Pantanal, often referred to as the "Pantanal complex", is a mixture of plant communities typical of a variety of surrounding biome regions: these include moist tropical Amazonian rainforest plants, semiarid woodland plants typical of northeast Brazil, Brazilian cerrado savanna plants, and plants of the Chaco savannas of Bolivia and Paraguay. Forests usually occur at higher altitudes of the region, while grasslands cover the seasonally inundated areas. The key limiting factors for growth are inundation and, even more importantly, water-stress during the dry season.

According to Embrapa, approximately 2,000 different plants have been identified in the Pantanal biome and classified according to their potential, with some presenting significant medicinal promise.

== Fauna ==
The Pantanal ecosystem is home to some 463 species of birds, 269 species of fish, more than 236 species of mammals, 141 species of reptiles and amphibians, and over 9,000 species and subspecies of invertebrates.

The apple snail (Pomacea lineata) is a keystone species in Pantanal's ecosystem. When the wetlands are flooded once a year, the grass and other plants will eventually die and start to decay. During this process, decomposing microbes deplete the shallow water of all oxygen, suffocating larger decomposers. Unlike other decomposing animals, the apple snails have both gills and lungs, making it possible for them to thrive in anoxic waters where they recycle the nutrients. To get oxygen, they extend a long snorkel to the water surface, pumping air into their lungs. This ability allows them to consume all the dead plant matter and turn it into nutritious fertilizer available for the plants in the area. The snails themselves are also food for a variety of animals.

Among the rarest animals to inhabit the wetland of the Pantanal are the marsh deer (Blastocerus dichotomus) and the giant river otter (Pteronura brasiliensis). Parts of the Pantanal are also home to the following endangered or threatened species: the hyacinth macaw (Anodorhyncus hyacinthinus) (a bird endangered due to smuggling), the crowned solitary eagle (Buteogallus coronatus), the maned wolf (Chrysocyon brachyurus), the bush dog (Speothos venaticus), the South American tapir (Tapirus terrestris), and the giant anteater (Myrmecophaga tridactyla). Common species in the Pantanal include the capybara (Hydrochoerus hydrochaeris), ocelot (Leopardus pardalis), and the yacare caiman (Caiman yacare). According to 1996 data, there were 10 million caimans in the Pantanal, making it the highest concentration of crocodilians in the world. The Pantanal is home to one of the largest and healthiest jaguar (Panthera onca) populations on Earth.

There are thirteen species of herons and egrets, six species of ibises and spoonbills, and five species of kingfishers that use the Pantanal as a breeding and feeding ground. There are nineteen species of parrots documented in the Pantanal, including five species of macaws. Some migratory birds include the American golden plover, peregrine falcon, and the bobolink.

Most fish are detritivores, primarily ingesting fine particles from sediments and plant surfaces. This is characteristic of fish living in South American flood-plains in general. Fish migration between river channels and flood-plain regions occurs seasonally. These fish have many adaptations that allow them to survive in the oxygen-depleted flood-plain waters.

In addition to the caiman, some of the reptiles that inhabit the Pantanal are the yellow anaconda (Eunectes notaeus), the gold tegu (Tupinambis teguixin), the red-footed tortoise (Geochelone carbonaria), the green iguana (Iguana iguana), and the venomous Pantanal coral snake (Micrurus tricolor).

=== Gallery ===
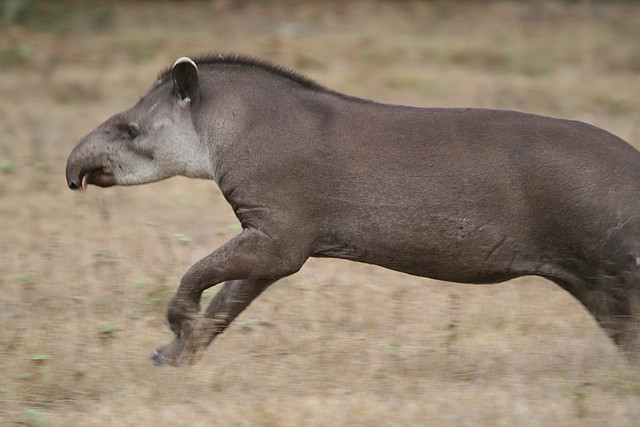
South American tapir

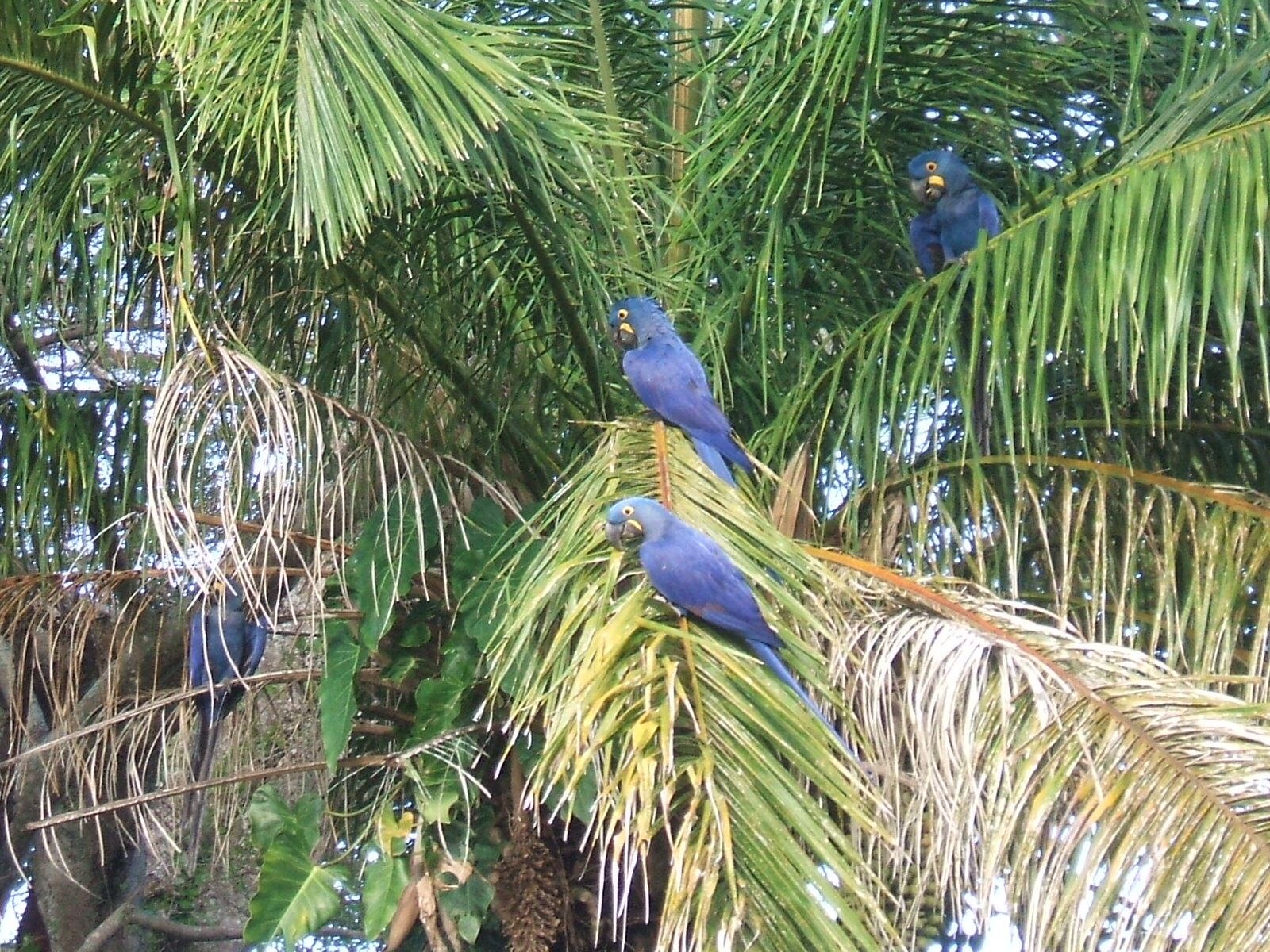
Hyacinth macaws

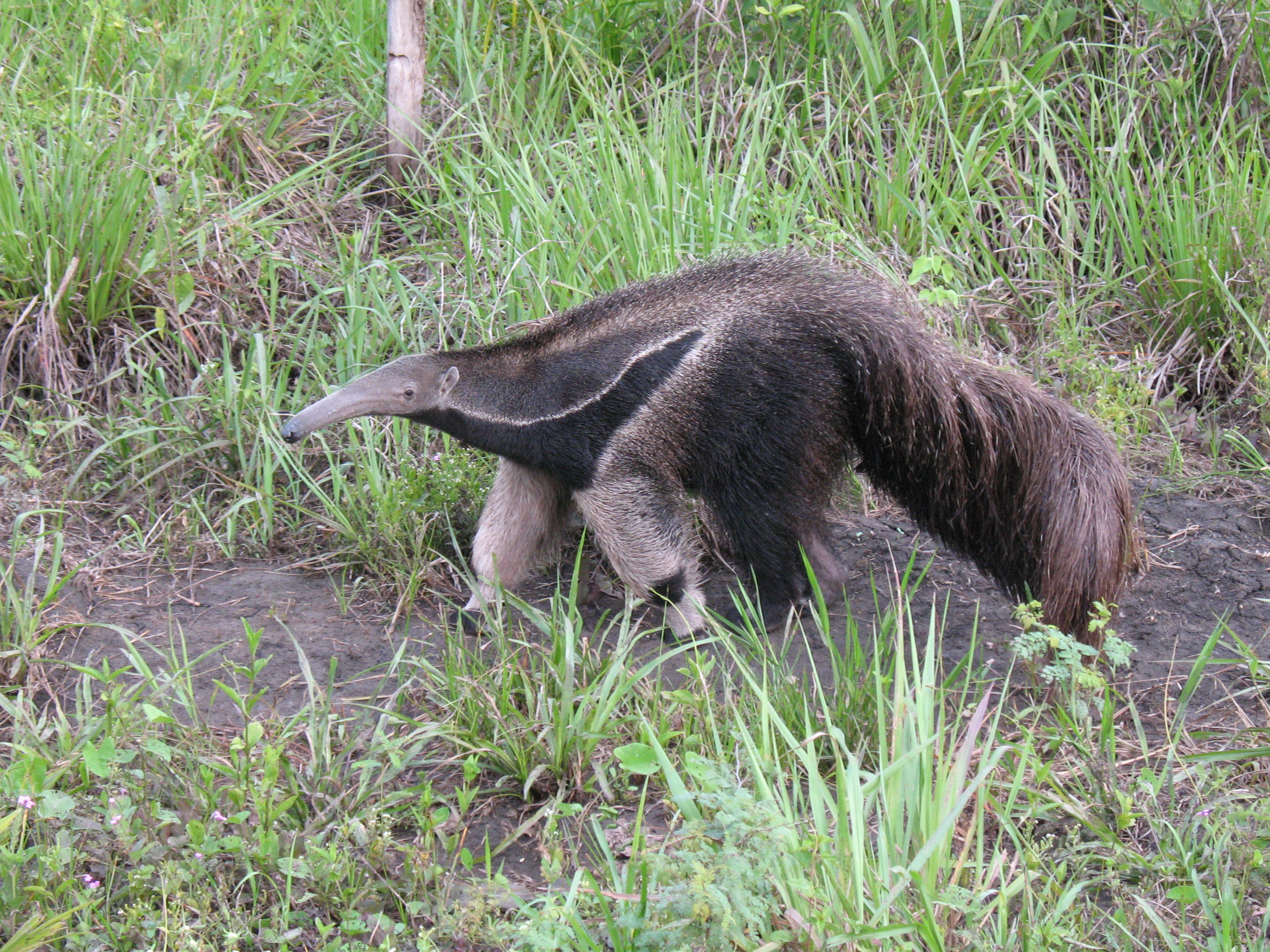
Giant anteater

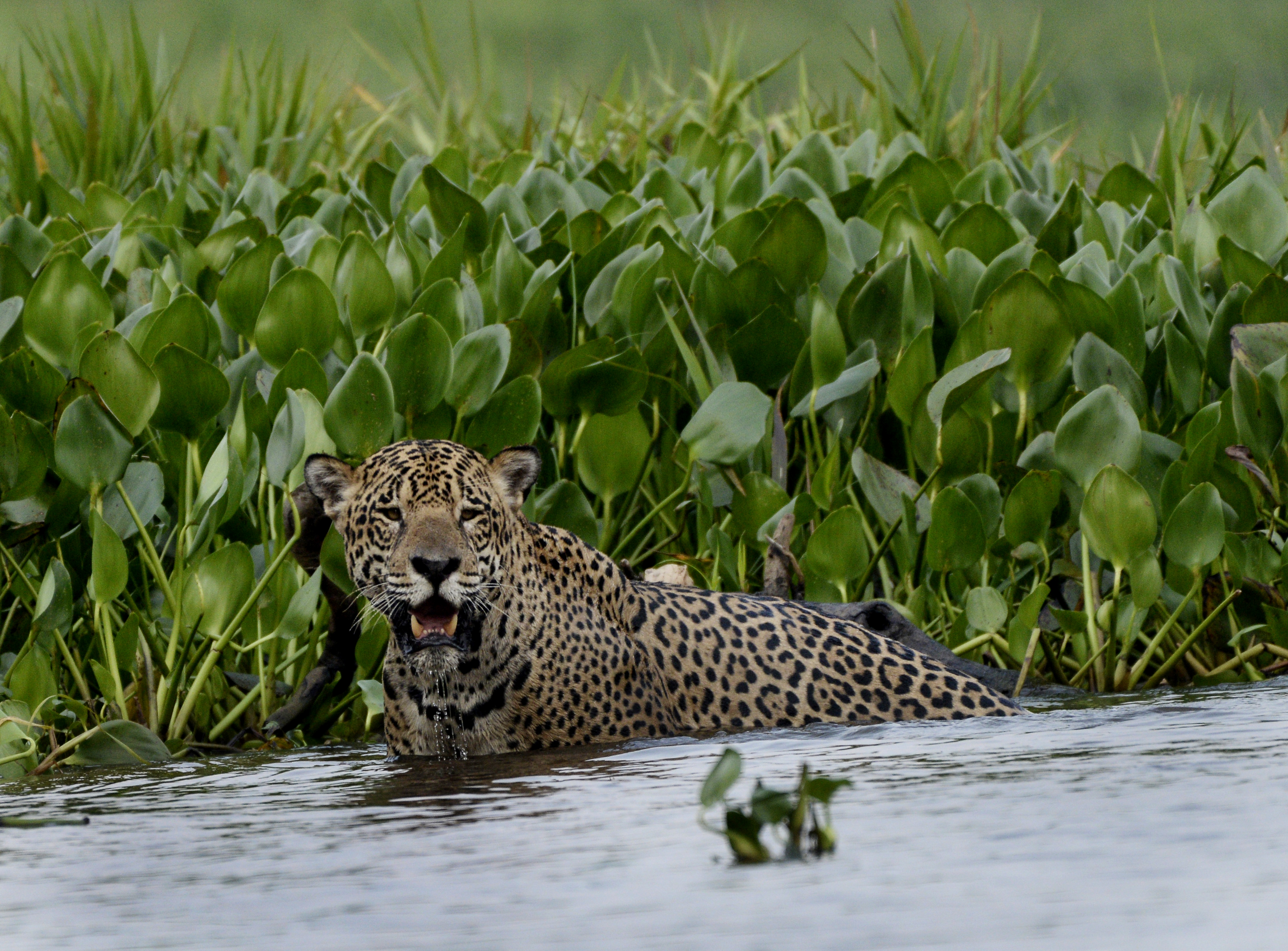
Jaguar

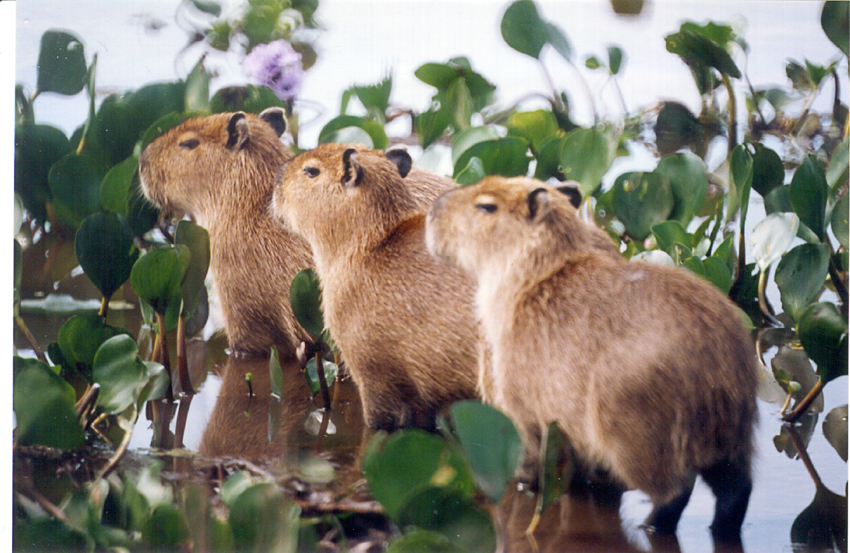
Capybaras

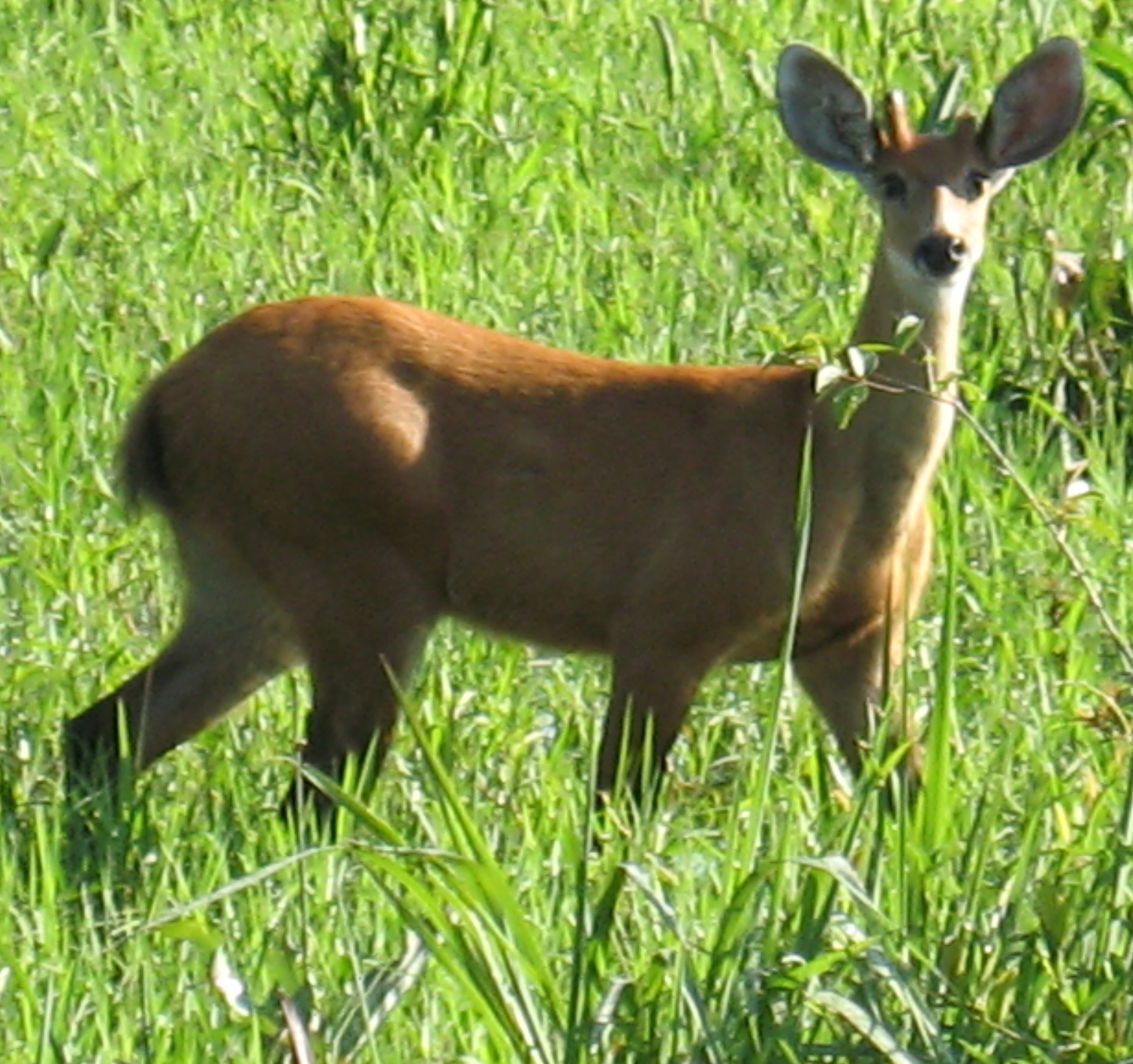
Marsh deer

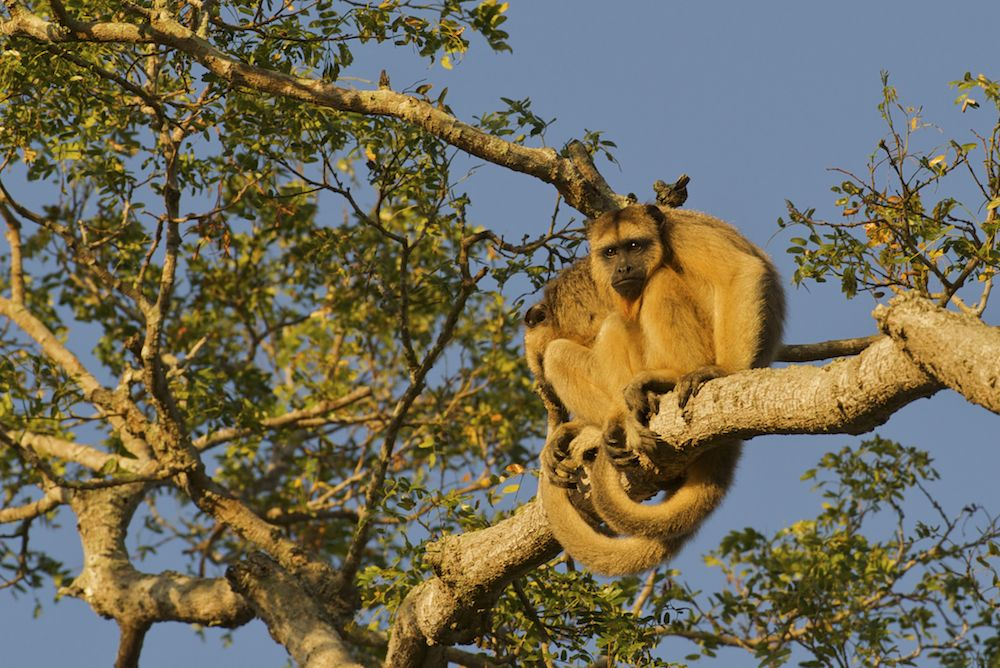
Black howler monkeys

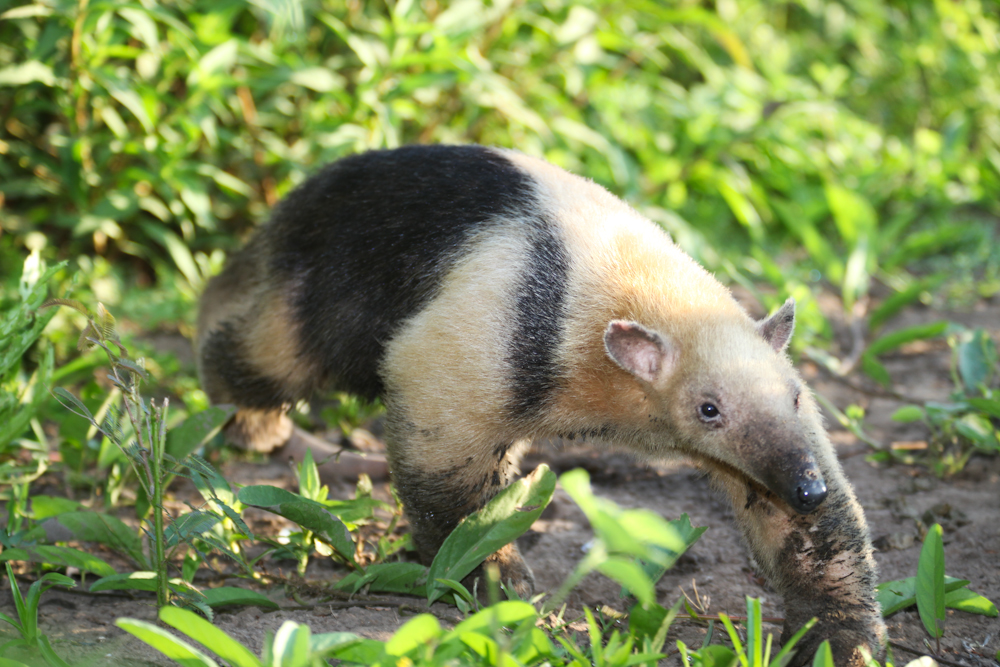
Southern tamandua

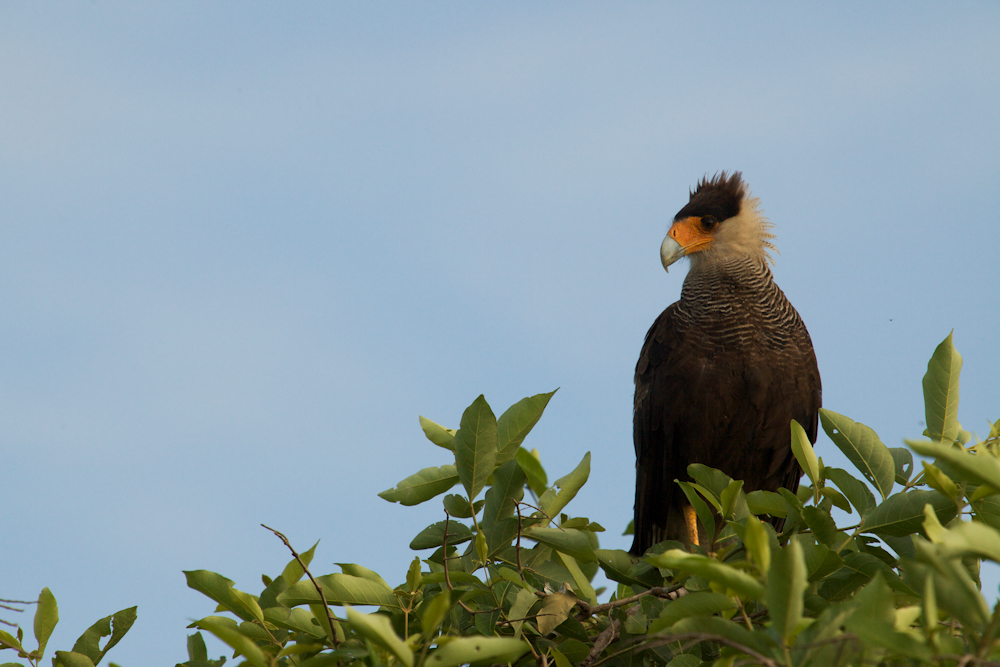
Crested caracara

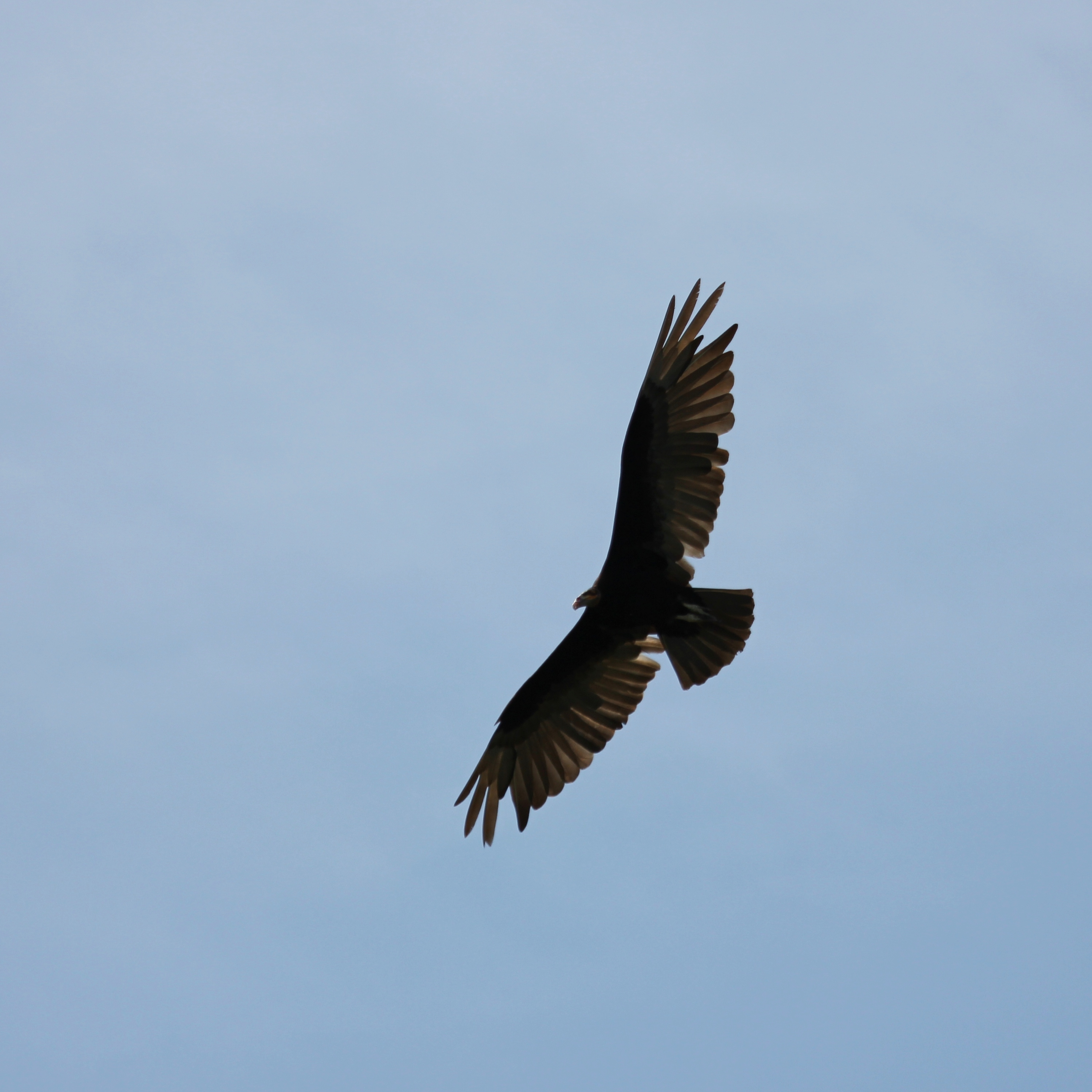
Lesser yellow-headed vulture

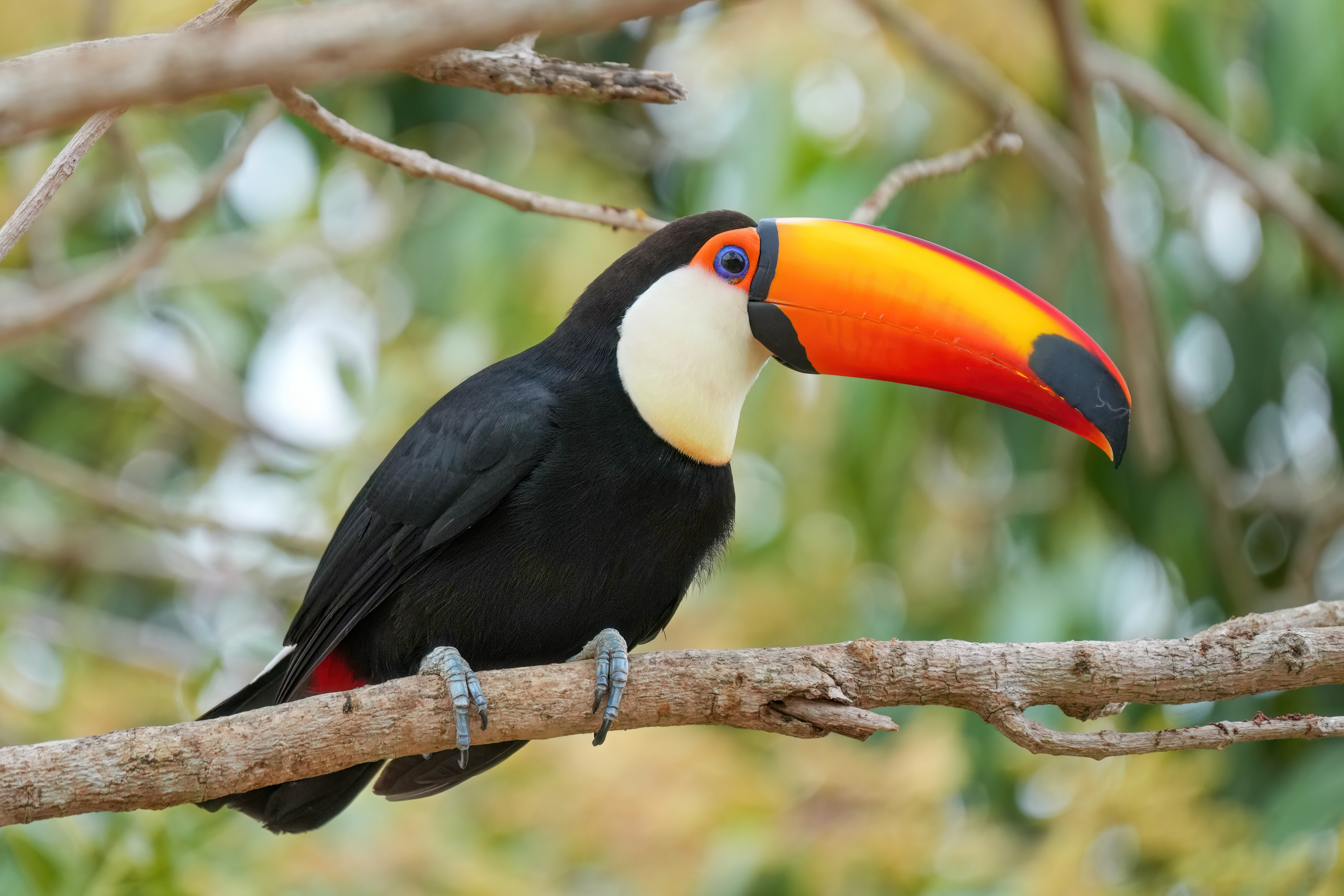
Toco toucan

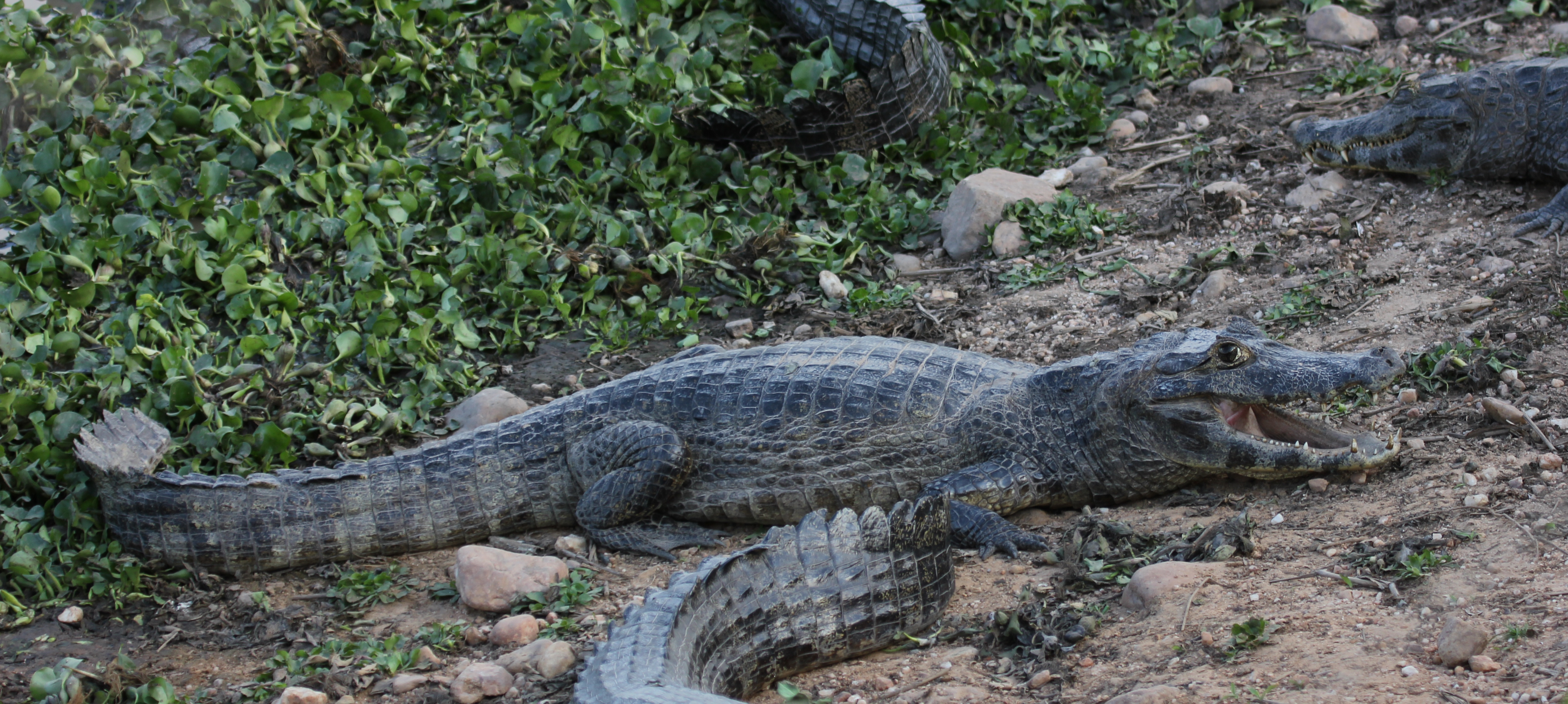
Yacare caiman

== Threats ==
The Pantanal region includes essential sanctuaries for migratory birds, critical nursery grounds for aquatic life, and refuges for such creatures as the yacare caiman, deer, and Pantanal jaguar. Most species are not under threat due to the low deforestation rates (less than 17%) of native vegetation now in the area due to new regulations.

Some of the causes which threaten the Pantanal ecosystems are:

- Fishing
  - Commercial fishing is focused on only a few species and is probably not sustainable. National and international sport fishing in the Paraguay river and its tributaries are the main focus for fishing activities. Local fishing communities have been under close watch by environmentalists as well.
- Cattle-ranching:
  - Approximately 99% of the land in the Pantanal is privately owned for the purpose of agriculture and ranching, even though there are some regulations on available land based on the extent of flooding during each wet season.
  - There are 2500 fazendas in the region and up to eight million cattle.
  - Erosion and sedimentation caused by this activity alter the soil and hydrological characteristics of Pantanal flood-plain ecosystems; consequently, native species are threatened by the change in ecosystem variables.
- Hunting, poaching, and smuggling of endangered species: Reptile, wildcat, and parrot species are particularly at risk from the smuggling industry due to their high value on the black market.
- Uncontrolled tourism and overuse of natural resources
  - In some areas of the Pantanal, particularly popular jaguar-viewing sites, increasing wildlife tourism has raised concerns about disturbance to animals, with reports that frequent boat traffic may alter jaguar behaviour and increase habituation to humans.
- Deforestation
  - Establishment of logging companies during political turmoils in the region resulted in peak deforestation rates between 1978 and 1989. Many livelihoods were dependent on harvesting rubber trees as new waves of migrants arrived, resulting in what is now there today.
  - Silt run-off from deforested highlands alters soil hydrology and is a significant threat to the Pantanal.
- Pollution from gold mining operations and agro-industry
  - The Pantanal is a natural water treatment system as it removes chemicals, including pollutants, from water. Pollution from industrial development (especially gold mining) can harm native flora and fauna.
  - However, water quality in the Pantanal was not significantly degraded as of 2002.
- Pollution from sewage systems and pesticides
  - Movement to large-scale agriculture of food crops, mainly soy-beans, has adopted the use of large quantities of chemical pesticides and fertilizers which leach into the soil or run-off to the flood plains of the Pantanal.
- Infrastructure development (shipping canals, raised roads, pipelines)
  - The proposed plan to dredge the Paraguay and Paraná Rivers to allow oceangoing ships to travel 3,442 km (2,139 mi) inland is of particular concern and could affect the hydrology (flooding and drainage cycles) of the region, and therefore impact the ecosystem.
- Forest fires
  - In late 2020, a quarter of the wetland was destroyed by an unprecedented fire attributed to climate change. An area estimated of about 19,890 square kilometres (7,681 mi^{2}) was razed by the fire, killing millions of vertebrates. Experts say 2020 was the most active year on record for wildfires. Until November 2020, Brazil's National Institute for Space Research (INPE) had detected more than 21,200 fires in the Pantanal biome, a figure that is 69% higher than 2005, when the INPE recorded roughly 12,500 fires. There were 8,106 fires in September 2020 alone—more than four times the historic average for the month.
- Climate change
  - Current predictive climate models indicate a progressive increase in the frequency of extreme events (for example, extreme rainfalls and extended droughts). These events could affect the Pantanal's ecosystem functioning, amplifying and worsening human modifications of hydrological and environmental conditions in the basin.

== Protected areas ==
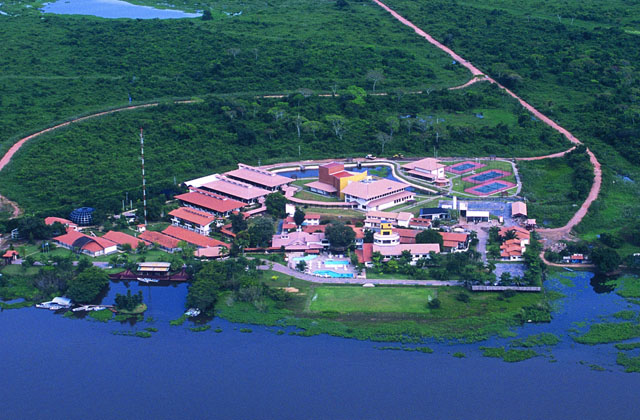
Hotel SESC Porto Cercado in the SESC Reserve

A portion of the Pantanal in Brazil has been protected as the Pantanal Matogrossense National Park. This 1,350 km^{2} (520 sq mi) park, established in September 1981, is located in the municipality of Poconé in the State of Mato Grosso, between the mouths of the Baía de São Marcos and the Gurupi Rivers. The park was designated a Ramsar Site of International Importance under the Ramsar Convention on May 24, 1993.

Encontro das Águas State Park and Guirá State Park are state parks of Mato Grosso in the Pantanal.

The SESC Pantanal Private Natural Heritage Reserve (Reserva Particular do Patrimonio Natural SESC Pantanal) is a privately owned reserve in Brazil, established in 1998 and 878.7 km^{2} (339.3 sq mi) in size. It is located in the north-eastern portion, known as "Poconé" Pantanal, not far from the Pantanal National Park. It is a mix of permanent rivers, seasonal streams, permanent and seasonal floodplain freshwater lakes, shrub-dominated wetlands and seasonally flooded forests, all dedicated to nature preservation, and was designated a Ramsar Site of International Importance under the Ramsar Convention.

Otuquis National Park and Integrated Management Natural Area and San Matías Integrated Management Natural Area are protected areas of Bolivia in the Pantanal. The entrance to Otuquis National Park is through the town of Puerto Suarez.

== Main cities ==
Brazil:

- Miranda, Mato Grosso do Sul
- Aquidauana, Mato Grosso do Sul
- Barão de Melgaço, Mato Grosso
- Bodoquena, Mato Grosso do Sul
- Bonito, Mato Grosso do Sul
- Cáceres, Mato Grosso
- Corumbá, Mato Grosso do Sul
- Coxim, Mato Grosso do Sul
- Ladário, Mato Grosso do Sul
- Poconé, Mato Grosso

Bolivia:

- Puerto Quijarro, Santa Cruz
- Puerto Suárez, Santa Cruz

Paraguay:

- Bahía Negra, Alto Paraguay
- Fuerte Olimpo, Alto Paraguay

== See also ==
- Wildlife of Brazil
- Iberá Wetlands
- Great Black Swamp, a former wetland in Ohio, US
