= Guirá State Park =

State park in Mato Grosso, Brazil

- Parque Estadual do Guirá
- IUCN category II (national park)
- Location within Brazil
- Nearest city: Cáceres, Mato Grosso
- Coordinates: 17.3607°S 57.8842°W
- Area: 114,000 hectares (280,000 acres)
- Designation: State park
- Created: 15 January 2002
- Administrator: Fundação Estadual do Meio Ambiente

The Guirá State Park (Portuguese: Parque Estadual do Guirá) is a state park in the state of Mato Grosso, Brazil.

== Location ==
The Guirá State Park ia in the municipality of Cáceres in the south of Mato Grosso, on the border with Bolivia. It has an area of 114,000 hectares (280,000 acres). It is in the Pantanal biome, and has a large population of deer. It adjoins the Pantanal Matogrossense National Park to the south.

== History ==
Creation of the park with an area of 412,225 hectares (1,018,630 acres) was reported to be approved by the state legislative assembly on 15 December 2001. It was justified by FEMA as essential for preserving the Pantanal ecosystem, threatened by human activities. The Guirá State Park was created by Mato Grosso Governor Dante Martins De Oliveira, who approved law 7.625 of 15 January 2002. The park would cover lands in Cáceres, on the border with Bolivia, with an area of about 100,000 hectares (250,000 acres).

The park is administered by the State Environmental Foundation. The objective is to preserve existing ecosystems and allow controlled public use, education and scientific research. On 17 October 2014 SEMA called on owners of land in the park to present their documents to allow regularization. The consultative council was created on 15 December 2014.

== Sources ==
- Oliveira, Marcia (15 December 2001), "MT cria duas unidades de conservação", Diário de Cuiabá (in Portuguese), archived from the original on 2016-12-20
- Oliveira, Dante Martins De (15 January 2002), Lei n° 7.625, de 15 de Janeiro de 2002 (in Portuguese), Estado de Mato Grosso, archived from the original on 2016-12-21
- Parque Estadual Guirá (in Portuguese), Via Rural, archived from the original on 2016-12-20
- PES do Guirá (in Portuguese), ISA: Instituto Socioambiental
