= Cáceres, Mato Grosso =

Cáceres
- Municipality
- Municipality of Cáceres
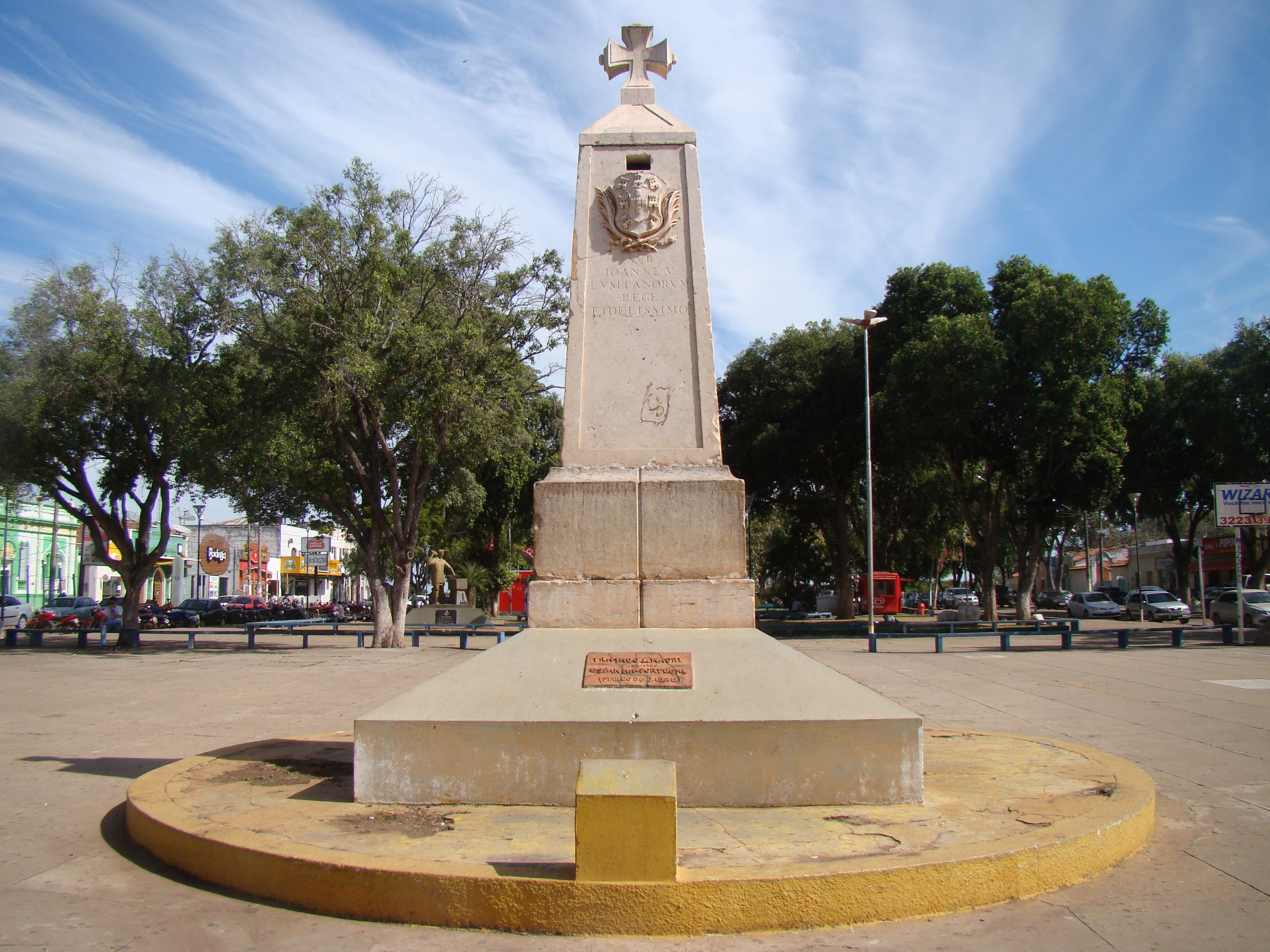
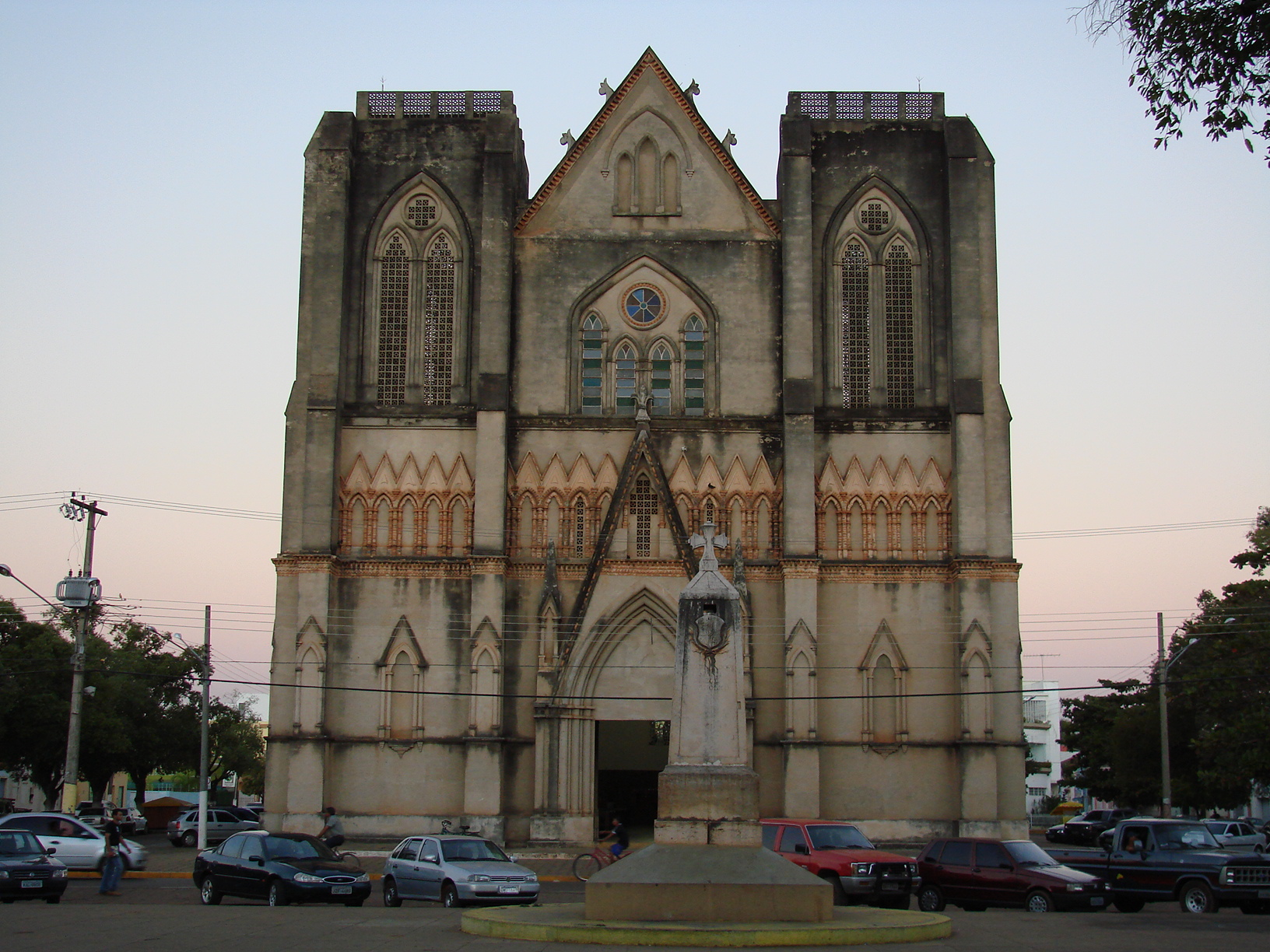

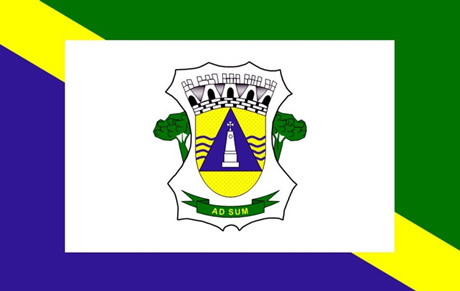
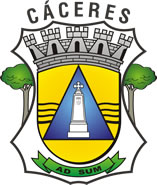
- Flag Coat of arms

- Location in Mato Grosso
- Country: Brazil
- Region: Central-West
- State: Mato Grosso
- Founded: 6 October 1778

Government
  - Mayor: Antônia Eliene Liberato Dias (PSB)

Area
  - Total: 24,495.510 km^{2} (9,457.769 sq mi)
- Elevation: 126 m (413 ft)

Population (2022)
  - Total: 89,681
  - Density: 3.6611/km^{2} (9.4823/sq mi)
- Time zone: UTC−4 (BRT)
- HDI (2010): 0.708 – high
- Website: caceres.mt.gov.br

Cáceres is a municipality in the Brazilian state of Mato Grosso. It covers an area of 24,000 km^{2} and as of 2022 had an estimated population of 89,681.

The town is sited on the Paraguay River, and hosts a popular fishing festival each September. The municipality contains part of the Serra das Araras Ecological Station. It also contains part of the Taiamã Ecological Station. The municipality contains the 114,000 hectares (280,000 acres) Guirá State Park, created in 2002.

Cáceres was the starting point of the Roosevelt–Rondon Scientific Expedition.

Cáceres is the administrative headquarters of the Mato Grosso State University and has 13 graduation courses and 3 post graduation courses.

== Climate ==
Climate data for Cáceres (1981–2010)
Month	Jan	Feb	Mar	Apr	May	Jun	Jul	Aug	Sep	Oct	Nov	Dec	Year
Mean daily maximum °C (°F)	32.6 (90.7)	32.5 (90.5)	32.7 (90.9)	32.4 (90.3)	30.9 (87.6)	30.7 (87.3)	31.1 (88.0)	33.1 (91.6)	33.4 (92.1)	34.6 (94.3)	33.8 (92.8)	33.0 (91.4)	32.6 (90.7)
Daily mean °C (°F)	27.1 (80.8)	26.9 (80.4)	26.9 (80.4)	26.1 (79.0)	24.1 (75.4)	23.0 (73.4)	22.5 (72.5)	24.3 (75.7)	25.6 (78.1)	27.4 (81.3)	27.3 (81.1)	27.2 (81.0)	25.7 (78.3)
Mean daily minimum °C (°F)	23.0 (73.4)	22.7 (72.9)	22.7 (72.9)	21.5 (70.7)	18.9 (66.0)	17.1 (62.8)	16.0 (60.8)	17.1 (62.8)	19.7 (67.5)	22.0 (71.6)	22.3 (72.1)	22.7 (72.9)	20.5 (68.9)
Average precipitation mm (inches)	252.8 (9.95)	193.7 (7.63)	171.5 (6.75)	89.6 (3.53)	31.9 (1.26)	13.4 (0.53)	16.5 (0.65)	20.8 (0.82)	44.2 (1.74)	96.8 (3.81)	129.2 (5.09)	210.3 (8.28)	1,270.7 (50.03)
Average precipitation days (≥ 1.0 mm)	14	13	12	8	4	2	1	2	4	7	10	14	91
Average relative humidity (%)	81.4	82.0	82.3	80.1	78.5	75.0	69.1	63.5	66.5	71.9	76.0	78.6	75.4
Mean monthly sunshine hours	127.5	106.4	118.6	163.8	179.0	186.3	220.6	176.1	90.6	139.3	150.4	131.5	1,790.1
Source: Instituto Nacional de Meteorologia

== Consular representation ==
Bolivia has a Consulate in Cáceres.

== See also ==
- Case of the three jaguars
