= Poconé =

Municipality in Mato Grosso, Brazil

- Municipality
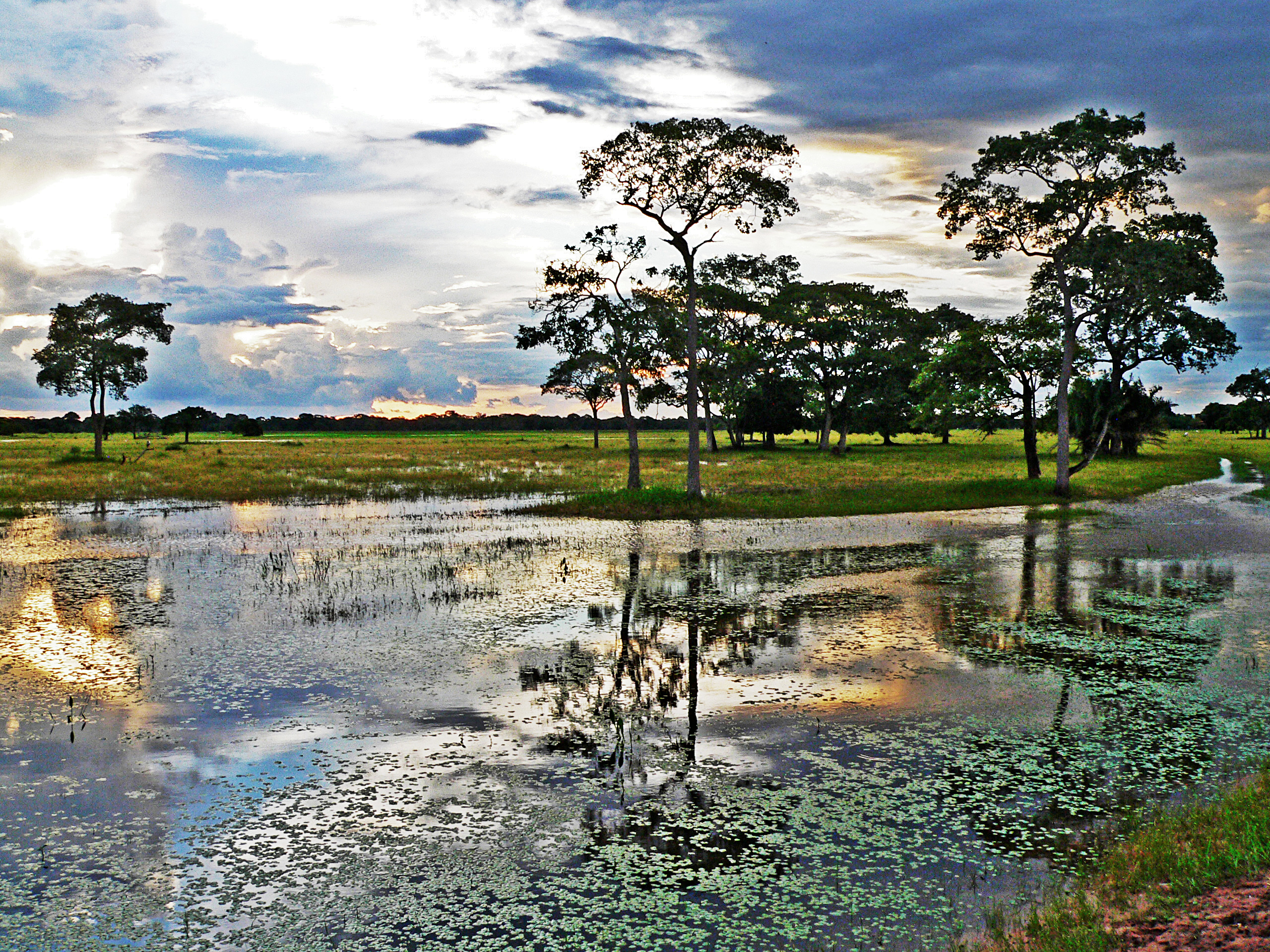
- Pantanal near Poconé

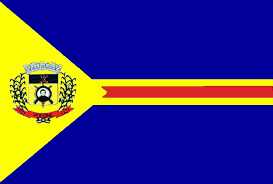
- Flag

- Location in Mato Grosso
- Coordinates: 16°15′52″S 56°37′41″W
- Country: Brazil
- Region: Center-West
- State: Mato Grosso
- Mesoregion: Centro-Sul Mato-Grossense

Population (2020)
  - Total: 33,315
- Time zone: UTC−3 (BRT)

Poconé is a municipality in the state of Mato Grosso in the Central-West Region of Brazil. The Bento Gomes River passes within a few kilometers of the village.

The municipality contains part of the Taiamã Ecological Station. The municipality contains 57% of the 108,960-hectare (269,200-acre) Encontro das Águas State Park, created in 2004.

== See also ==
- List of municipalities in Mato Grosso
