= Battle of Ytororó order of battle =

List of combatants

The following units and commanders of the Brazilian and Paraguayan armies fought in the Battle of Ytororó on 6 December 1866.

== Imperial Brazilian Army ==
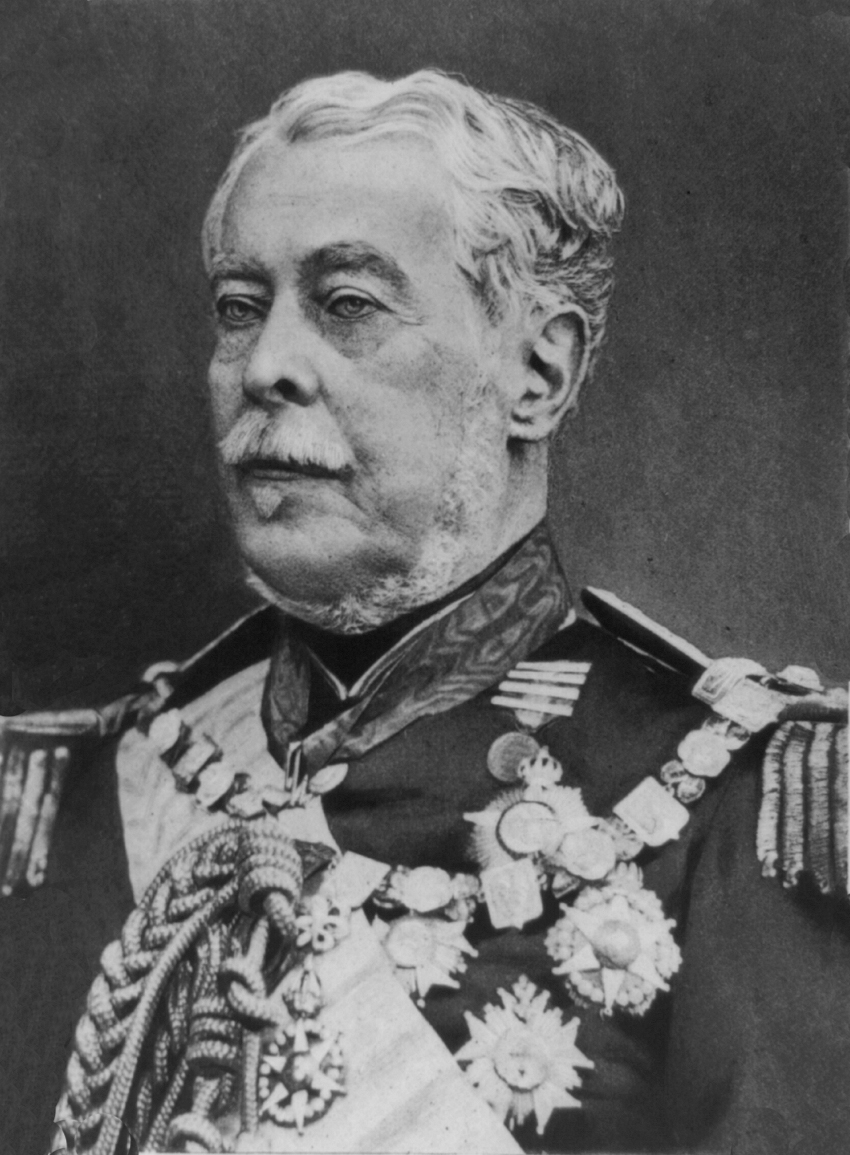
Marshal of the Army Luís Alves de Lima e Silva, Marquis of Caxias

Marshal of the Army Luís Alves de Lima e Silva, Marquis of Caxias

=== I Corps ===
General Jacinto Machado de Bittencourt

Division	Brigade	Regiments and Others
5th Division; Colonel Betbeze Olivera	4th Brigade Colonel Faria Rocha	25th Corpos de Voluntários; 29th Corpos de Voluntários; 33rd Corpos de Voluntários
5th Division; Colonel Betbeze Olivera	9th Brigade Colonel Lourenço de Araújo	41st Corpos de Voluntários; 42nd Corpos de Voluntários; 46th Corpos de Voluntários; 51st Corpos de Voluntários
5th Division; Colonel Betbeze Olivera	10th Brigade Colonel Luis de Albuquerque Maranhão	23rd Corpos de Voluntários; 47th Corpos de Voluntários; 50th Corpos de Voluntários

=== II Corps ===
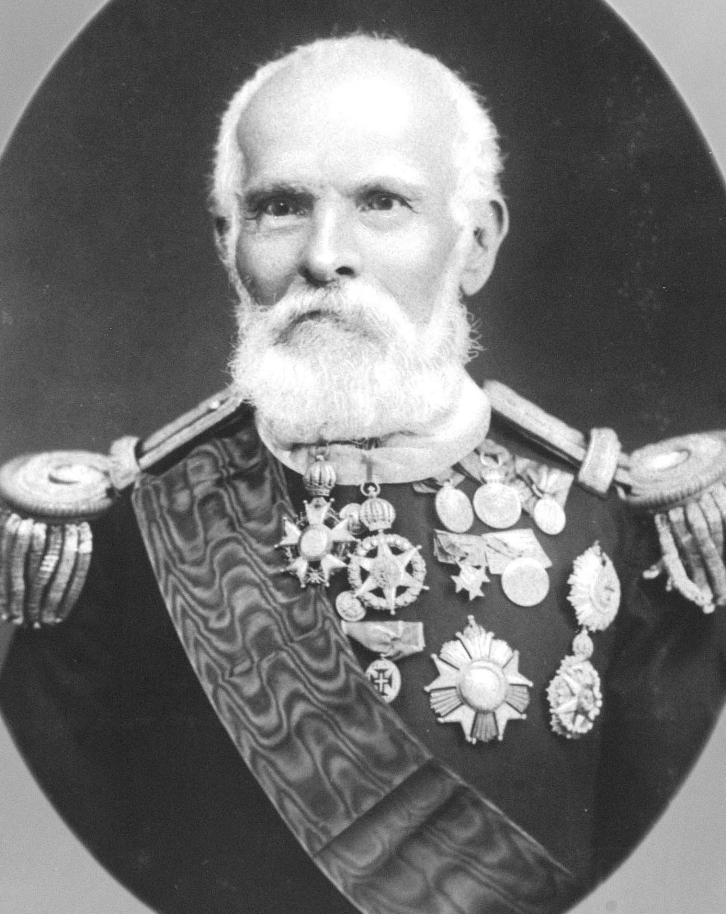
Coronel Hermes Ernesto da Fonseca

General Alexandre Gomes de Argolo Ferrão Filho

Division	Brigade	Regiments and Others
1st Division; General Antunes Gurjão	1st Brigade Colonel Miranda Reis	4th Line Battalion; 12th Line Battalion; 16th Line Battalion
1st Division; General Antunes Gurjão	8th Brigade Colonel Hermes Ernesto da Fonseca	8th Line Battalion; 10th Line Battalion; 32nd Corpos de Voluntários; 38th Corpos de Voluntários
1st Division; General Antunes Gurjão	13th Brigade Colonel Barros de Vasconcelos	24th Corpos de Voluntários; 28th Corpos de Voluntários; 51st Corpos de Voluntários
2nd Division; General Salustiano Jerônimo dos Reis	2nd Brigade Colonel Rodrigues Seixas	2nd Line Battalion; 26th Corpos de Voluntários; 40th Corpos de Voluntários
2nd Division; General Salustiano Jerônimo dos Reis	5th Brigade Colonel Fernando Machado de Sousa	1st Line Battalion; 13th Line Battalion; 34th Corpos de Voluntários; 48th Corpos de Voluntários
Other	Cavalry Colonel João Niederauer Sobrinho	6th Provisional Cavalry Corps; 9th Provisional Cavalry Corps; 13th Provisional Cavalry Corps; 7th Provisional Cavalry Corps, one squadron; 20th Provisional Cavalry Corps, one squadron
Other	Artillery Colonel Lobo d'Eça	2nd Provisional Horse Artillery Regiment

=== III Corps ===
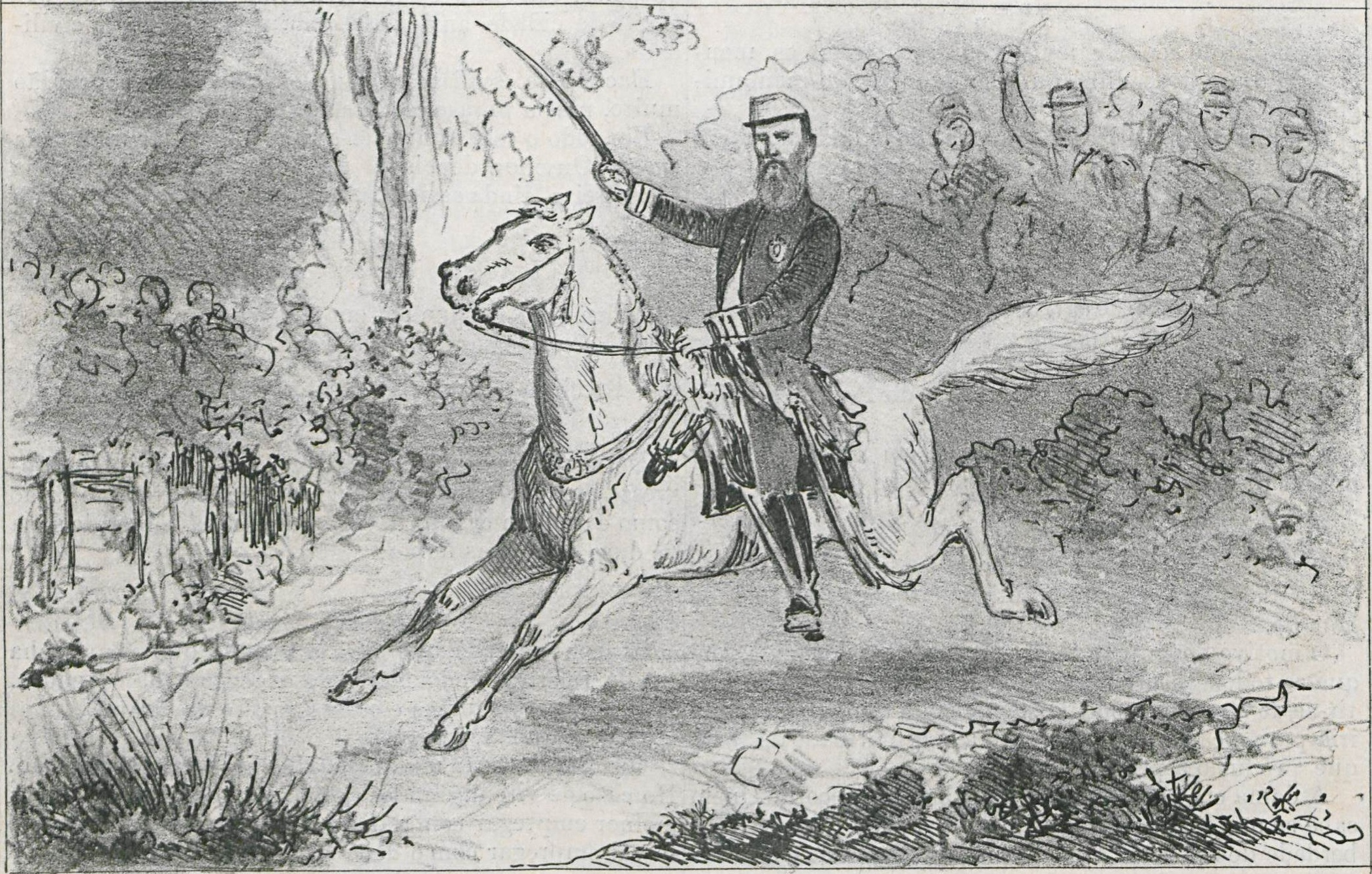
A cartoon of General Herculano Sancho da Silva Pedra

General Manuel Luís Osório

Division	Brigade	Regiments and Others
3rd Division; General José Auto da Silva Guimarães	3rd Brigade Colonel Pereira Carvalho	3rd Line Battalion; 9th Line Battalion; 14th Line Battalion; 35th Corpos de Voluntários
3rd Division; General José Auto da Silva Guimarães	7th Brigade Colonel Frederico de Mesquita	5th Line Battalion; 39th Corpos de Voluntários; 31st Corpos de Voluntários; 55th Corpos de Voluntários
4th Division; General Herculano da Silva Pedra	11th Brigade Colonel Olivera Bueno	11th Line Battalion; 27th Corpos de Voluntários; 32nd Corpos de Voluntários; 29th Corpos de Voluntários
4th Division; General Herculano da Silva Pedra	12th Brigade Colonel Francisco Caldas	36th Corpos de Voluntários; 44th Corpos de Voluntários; 49th Corpos de Voluntários

== Paraguayan Army ==
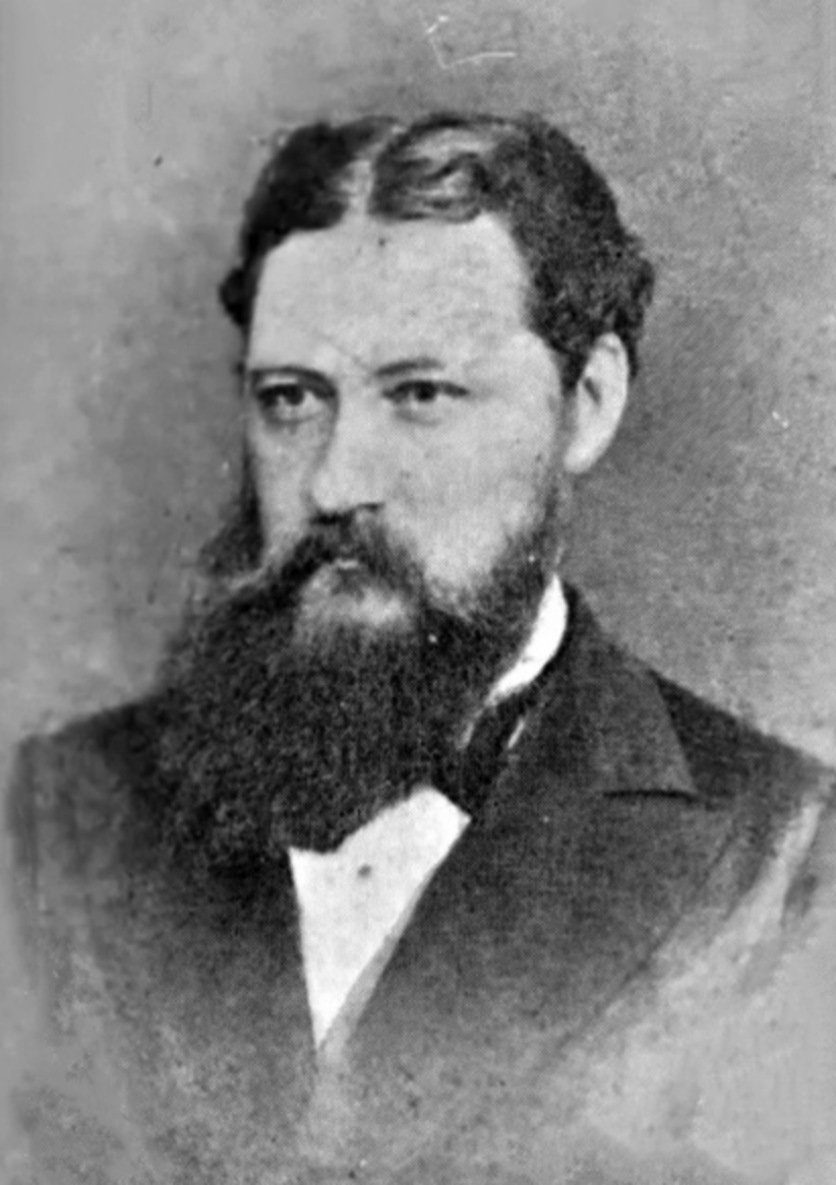
General Bernardino Caballero

Division	Brigade	Regiments and Others
Division; General Bernardino Caballero	Cavalry General Bernardino Caballero	6th Cavalry Regiment; 9th Cavalry Regiment; 12th Cavalry Regiment; 19th Cavalry Regiment; 30th Cavalry Regiment
Division; General Bernardino Caballero	Infantry Colonel Germán Serrano	2nd Infantry Battalion; 3rd Infantry Battalion; 20th Infantry Battalion; 36th Infantry Battalion; 37th Infantry Battalion; 40th Infantry Battalion

== Sources ==
- Warner, William. "Paraguayan Thermopylae: The Battle of Itororo", in Strategy & Tactics, issue 271 (November/December 2011).
