= Battle of Tuyutí order of battle =

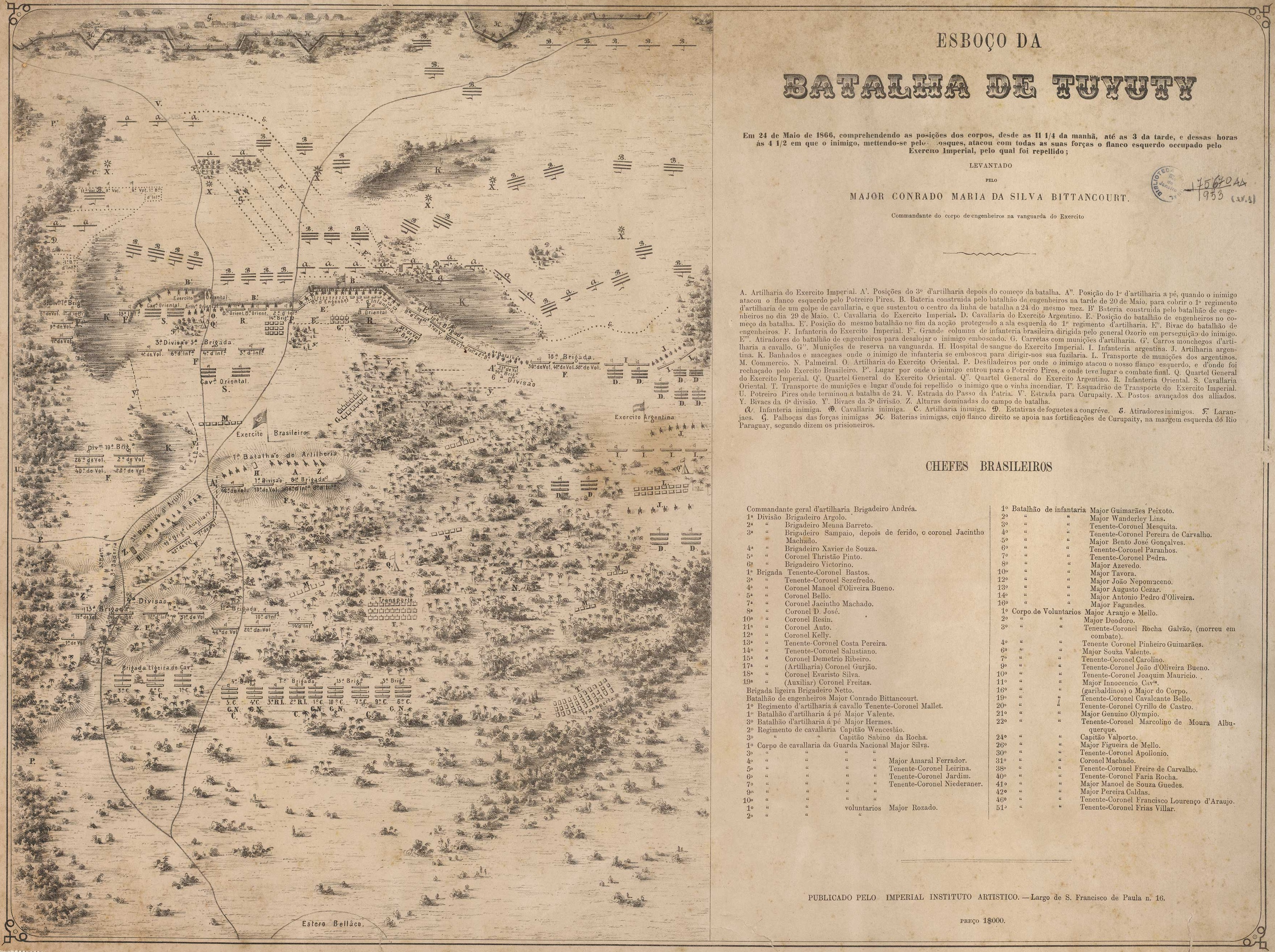
Sketch of the battle of Tuyutí

The Battle of Tuyutí was an engagement during the Paraguayan War (1864–1870) between Paraguay and the Triple Alliance of Brazil, Argentina and Uruguay. It was fought on May 24, 1866, with the forces aligned as follows:

== Abbreviations used ==
=== Military rank ===
- Gen = General
- BG = Brigadier general
- Col = Colonel
- Ltc = Lieutenant colonel

== Paraguayan Army ==
Commander	Column	Regiments and Others
Gen. Vicente Barrios	1st Attacking Column	6 Infantry Regiments; 2 Cavalry Regiments; 4 rocket-launchers and several light artillery
BG Francisco Isidoro Resquín	2nd Attacking Column	2 Infantry Regiments; 6 cavalry regiments; 2 rocket-launchers
Col. José E. Díaz	3rd Attacking Column	5 Infantry Regiments; 2 Cavalry Regiments; 4 light artillery
Col. Hilario Marcó	4th Attacking Column	4 Infantry Regiments; 2 Cavalry Regiments
Gen. José María Bruguez	Reserves	At least 2 Cavalry Regiments

== Imperial Brazilian Army ==
Gen. Manuel Luís Osório

Division	Brigade	Regiments and Others
1st Division; Gen. Alexandre Argolo	8th Brigade Col. José	8th Infantry Battalion; 16th Infantry Battalion; 10th Fatherland Volunteers Corps; 46th Fatherland Volunteers Corps
1st Division; Gen. Alexandre Argolo	10th Brigade Col. Carlos Resín	2nd Infantry Battalion; 13th Infantry Battalion; 22nd Fatherland Volunteers Corps; 26th Fatherland Volunteers Corps; 40th Fatherland Volunteers Corps
3rd Division; Gen. Antônio de Sampaio (k)	5th Brigade Col. Belo	3rd Infantry Battalion; 4th Infantry Battalion; 6th Infantry Battalion; 4th Fatherland Volunteers Corps
3rd Division; Gen. Antônio de Sampaio (k)	7th Brigade Col. Fernando Machado de Sousa	1st Infantry Battalion; 6th Fatherland Volunteers Corps; 9th Fatherland Volunteers Corps; 11th Fatherland Volunteers Corps
4th Division; Gen. Guilherme Xavier	11th Brigade Col. José Autó	10th Infantry Battalion; 14th Infantry Battalion; 20th Fatherland Volunteers Corps; 31st Fatherland Volunteers Corps
4th Division; Gen. Guilherme Xavier	13th Brigade Ltc. C. Pereira	12th Infantry Battalion; 1st Fatherland Volunteers Corps; 19th Fatherland Volunteers Corps; 24th Fatherland Volunteers Corps
6th Division; Gen. Vitorino Carneiro	12th Brigade Col. Joaquim Coelho Kelly	5th Infantry Battalion; 7th Infantry Battalion; 3rd Fatherland Volunteers Corps; 16th Fatherland Volunteers Corps
6th Division; Gen. Vitorino Carneiro	14th Brigade Ltc. Salustiano Jerônimo dos Reis	2nd Infantry Battalion; 14th Fatherland Volunteers Corps; 21st Fatherland Volunteers Corps; 30th Fatherland Volunteers Corps
2nd Cavalry Division; BG José Luís Mena Barreto	1st Brigade Ltc. Augusto de Araujo Bastos	2nd Cavalry Regiment; 3rd Cavalry Regiment; I National Guard Cavalry Corps
2nd Cavalry Division; BG José Luís Mena Barreto	4th Brigade Ltc. Manoel de Oliveira Bueno	2nd Infantry Battalion; II National Guard Cavalry Corps; V National Guard Cavalry Corps; VII National Guard Cavalry Corps
5th Cavalry Division; Col. Tristão Pinto	3rd Brigade Ltc. Julio Mesquita	IV National Guard Cavalry Corps; VI National Guard Cavalry Corps; XI National Guard Cavalry Corps
5th Cavalry Division; Col. Tristão Pinto	15th Brigade Col. Demetrio Ribeiro	III Infantry Battalion; IX National Guard Cavalry Corps; X National Guard Cavalry Corps
Volunteer Cavalry Brigade; BG Antônio de Sousa Neto	3rd Brigade Ltc. Julio Mesquita	1st Volunteer Cavalry; 2nd Volunteer Cavalry; 3rd Volunteer Cavalry; 4th Volunteer Cavalry
Volunteer Cavalry Brigade; BG Antônio de Sousa Neto	Artillery Train Gen. Andrea	N/A
Volunteer Cavalry Brigade; BG Antônio de Sousa Neto	17th Brigade Col. Hilário Gurjão	1st Mounted Artillery Regiment; 1st Foot Artillery Regiment; 3rd Foot Artillery Regiment
Volunteer Cavalry Brigade; BG Antônio de Sousa Neto	19th Brigade Col. Francisco Gomes de Freitas	Engineer Battalion; 7th Fatherland Volunteers Corps; 42nd Fatherland Volunteers Corps

== Argentine Army ==
Gen. Bartolomé Mitre

=== I Army Corps ===
Gen. Wenceslao Paunero

Division	Brigade	Regiments and Others
1st Division; Col. Ignacio Rivas	1st Brigade Ltc. Manuel Rosetti	1st Infantry Battalion; 5th Infantry Battalion
1st Division; Col. Ignacio Rivas	2nd Brigade Ltc. Juan Bautista Charlone	Legión Militár Infantry Battalion
2nd Division; Col. José Arredondo	3rd Brigade Ltc. Manuel Fraga	4th Infantry Battalion; 6th Infantry Battalion
2nd Division; Col. José Arredondo	4th Brigade Ltc. Orms	2nd Infantry Battalion; 1st Legion of Volunteers
3rd Division; Col. José Ramón Esquivel	5th Brigade Col. José Ramón Esquivel	National Guard Battalion Corrientes; National Guard Battalion Rosario
3rd Division; Col. José Ramón Esquivel	6th Brigade Ltc. Casanova	National Guard Battalion Catamarca; National Guard Battalion Tucumán
4th Division; Col. Mateo Martinez	7th Brigade Ltc. Adolfo Orma	3rd Infantry Battalion; 2nd Legion of Volunteers
4th Division; Col. Mateo Martinez	8th Brigade Ltc. Benjamin Calvete	National Guard Battalion Santa Fé; National Guard Battalion Salta
Attached Units	Cavalry Brigade Col. José Maria Fernandes	Mitre's Mounted Escort; 1st Cavalry Regiment; National Guard Cavalry Regiment of Santa Fé
Attached Units	Artillery Brigade Ltc. Leopoldo Nelson	2nd Horse Artillery Battery; 3rd Horse Artillery Battery; 4th Horse Artillery Battery

=== II Army Corps ===
Gen. Juan Andrés Gelly y Obes

Division	Regiments and Others
1st Division; Gen. Emilio Conesa	1st National Guard Infantry Battalion of Buenos Aires; 2nd National Guard Infantry Battalion of Buenos Aires; 3rd National Guard Infantry Battalion of Buenos Aires; 4th National Guard Infantry Battalion of Buenos Aires
2nd Division Col. José Bustillo	5th National Guard Infantry Battalion of Buenos Aires; 6th National Guard Infantry Battalion of Buenos Aires; 7th National Guard Infantry Battalion of Buenos Aires; 8th National Guard Infantry Battalion of Buenos Aires
3rd Division Col. Julio de Vedia	National Guard Infantry Battalion "Córboda"; National Guard Infantry Battalion "San Juán"; National Guard Infantry Battalion "Segundo de Entre Ríos"; National Guard Infantry Battalion "Mendoza"
4th Division Col. Mateo Martinez	9th Infantry Battalion; 12th Infantry Battalion; National Guard Infantry Battalion "Tercero de Entre Ríos"; National Guard Infantry Battalion "La Rioja"
Cavalry Division Col. Pedro Oyarzabal	1st National Guard Cavalry Regiment of Buenos Aires; 2nd National Guard Cavalry Regiment of Buenos Aires
Artillery Section Col. Federico Mitre	1st Horse Artillery Battery

== National Army of Uruguay ==
Division	Brigade	Regiments and Others
Uruguayan Division; Gen. Venancio Flores	1st Infantry Brigade Col. León de Pallejas	Infantry Battalion "Florida"; Infantry Battalion "24 de Abril"
Uruguayan Division; Gen. Venancio Flores	2nd Infantry Brigade Ltc. Marcelino Castro	Infantry Battalion "Voluntários de la Libertard"; Infantry Battalion "Independencia"
Uruguayan Division; Gen. Venancio Flores	Cavalry Brigade Col. de Castro	1st National Guard Cavalry Regiment; 2nd National Guard Cavalry Regiment; 4th National Guard Cavalry Regiment
