= Gurjão (surname) =

Gurjão is a surname. Notable people with the surname include:

- Bergson Gurjão Farias (1947–1972), Brazilian activist and Communist guerrilla; disappeared
- Hilário Maximiniano Antunes Gurjão (1820–1869), Brazilian Army general
- José Onofre Gurjão, Brazilian economist and educator
- Oscar Luiz Ribeiro Gurjão Cotrim (1923–2010), Brazilian physician and politician
- Rafael Fernandes Gurjão (1891–1952), Brazilian politician
