= Pikysyry maneuver =

Brazilian defense tactic

- Part of the Pikysyry campaign
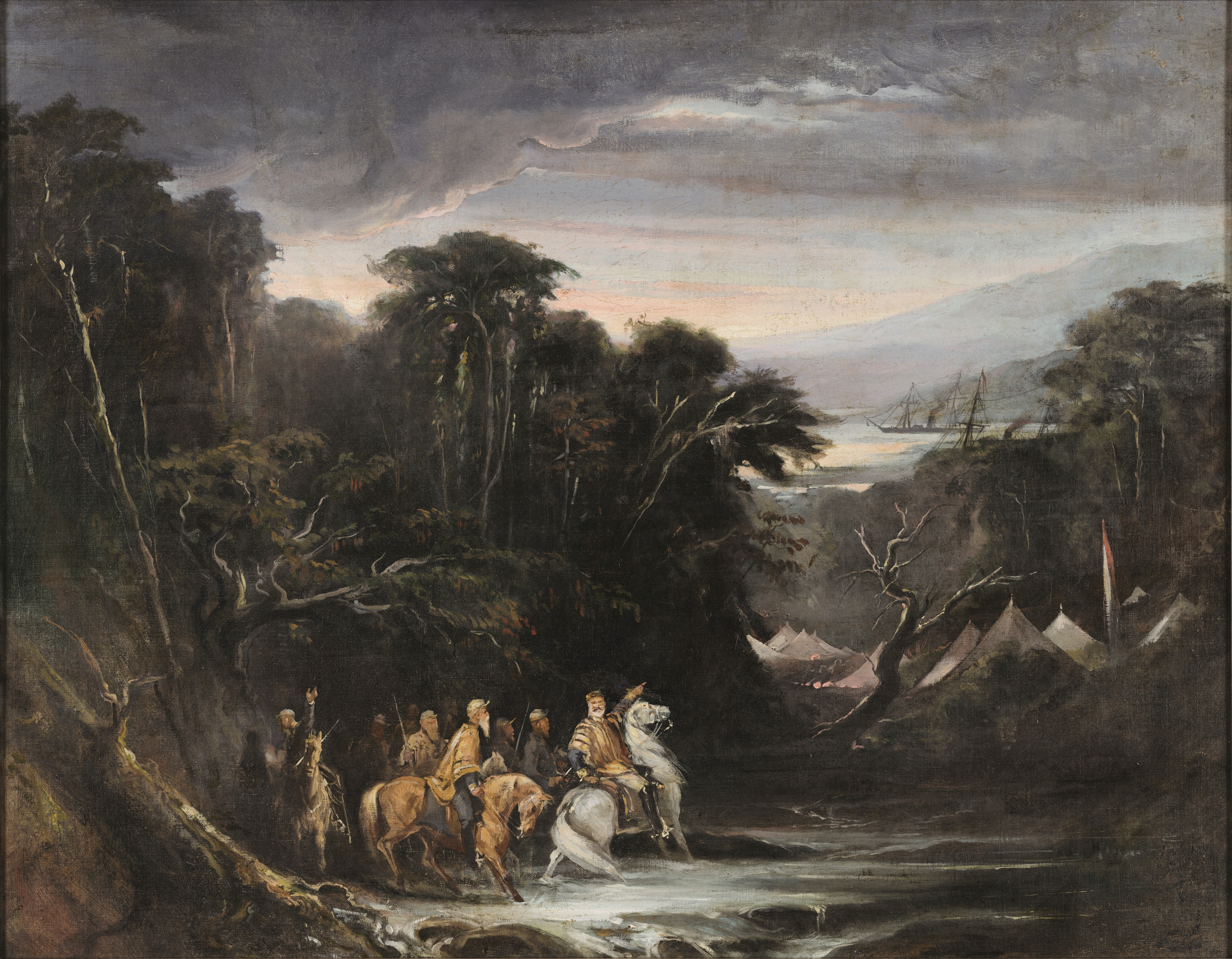
- Estudo para Passagem do Chaco, oil on canvas by Pedro Américo
Date	21 December 1868
Location	Formosa province, Argentina
Result	Allied victory

Belligerents
Paraguay	Empire of Brazil; Argentina; Uruguay

Commanders and leaders
Solano López; George Thompson	Marquess of Caxias; Juan Andrés Gelly

Strength
2,000 men	8,000 men

Casualties and losses
600 killed, 200 captured	

The Pikysyry maneuver was a tactic used by Brazilian marshal Luís Alves de Lima e Silva, Duke of Caxias, during the Pikysyry campaign (part of the Paraguayan War) to outflank the Paraguayan southern defense line along the stream of Pikysyry consisting of 142 gun platforms along a line 9.1 km long, built by the British engineer Lt. Col. George Thompson. Just to the north were the batteries of Angostura, protecting the River Paraguay. Marshal Caxias decided to attack from the Paraguayan rear by constructing a 10.7 km road on the Chaco side of the river starting at Santa Theresa.

== Background ==
On 11 Oct. 1868, 1,122 men under the command of Lt. Col. Antonio Tiburcio landed near Santa Theresa on the west side of the Paraguay River. An additional 2,925 infantry, 327 pontoniers, 198 artillerymen and 94 cavalry were landed and overall command for building the road was the responsibility of Lt. Col. Rufino Galvao of the Engineers. The road was constructed of palm tree trunks. On 27 Nov. Marshal Caxias moved his headquarters to the Chaco side of the river. By early December, the road had been completed to Santa Helena and 19,000 Allied troops were ready to cross over to San Antonio.

== Battle of Pikysyry ==
After the successful battles of Ytororó and Avay, the allied army was ready to capture the Paraguayan defenses at Pikysyry. A column of 2,700 men under general João Manuel Mena Barreto mounted a flanking movement while troops under general Juan Andrés Gelly y Obes made a simultaneous feint to the front. The December 21 attack was a complete surprise to the Paraguayans.

== Aftermath ==
Some 500 Paraguayans escaped to Angostura and another 200 to Lomas Valentinas.

== Gallery ==
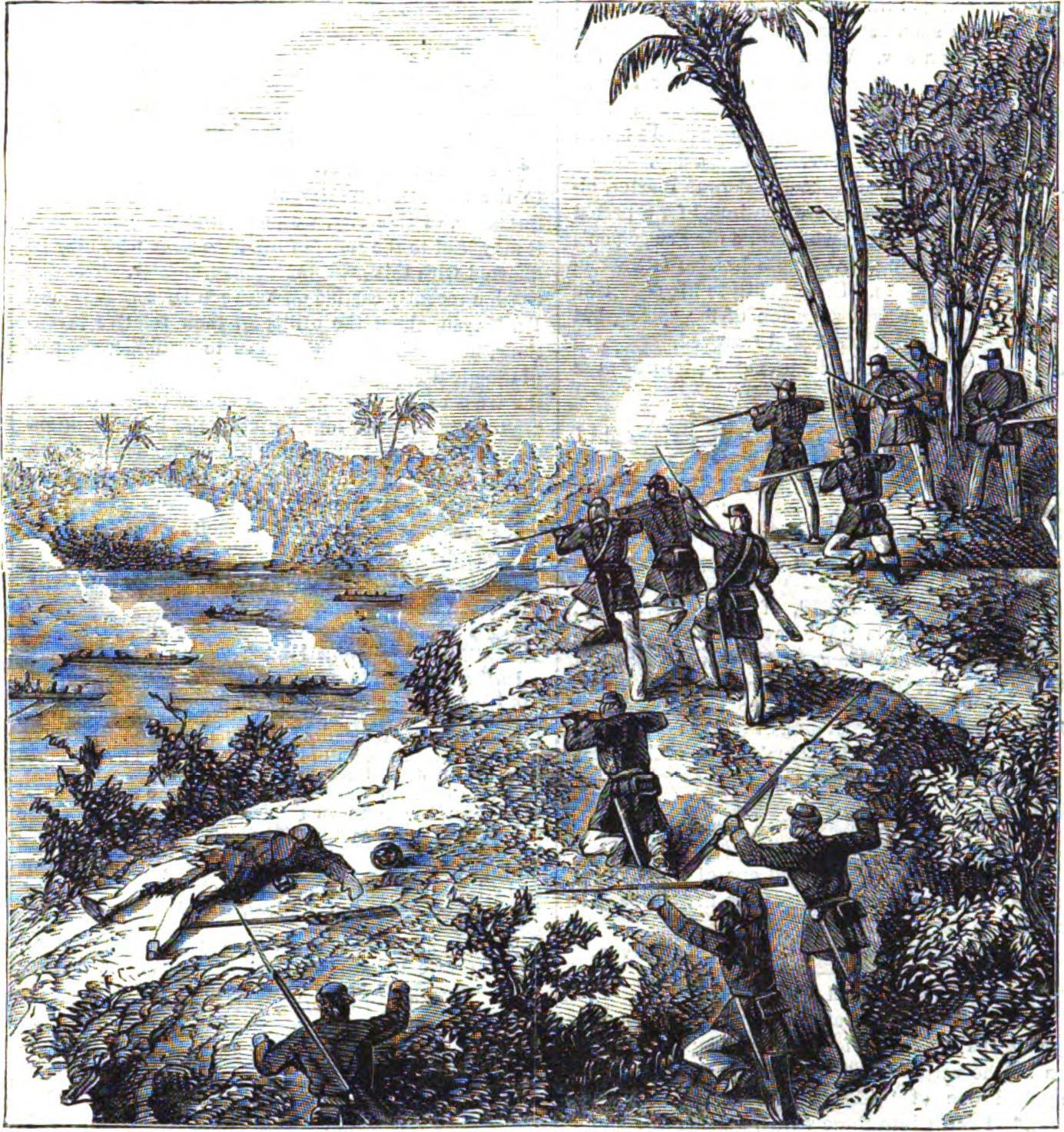
Engagement at Chaco (Harper's Weekly: A Journal of Civilization, Vol. XII, nº 617, 24/10/1868)
