= Pikysyry campaign =

Campaign in the Paraguayan War

- Part of the Paraguayan War
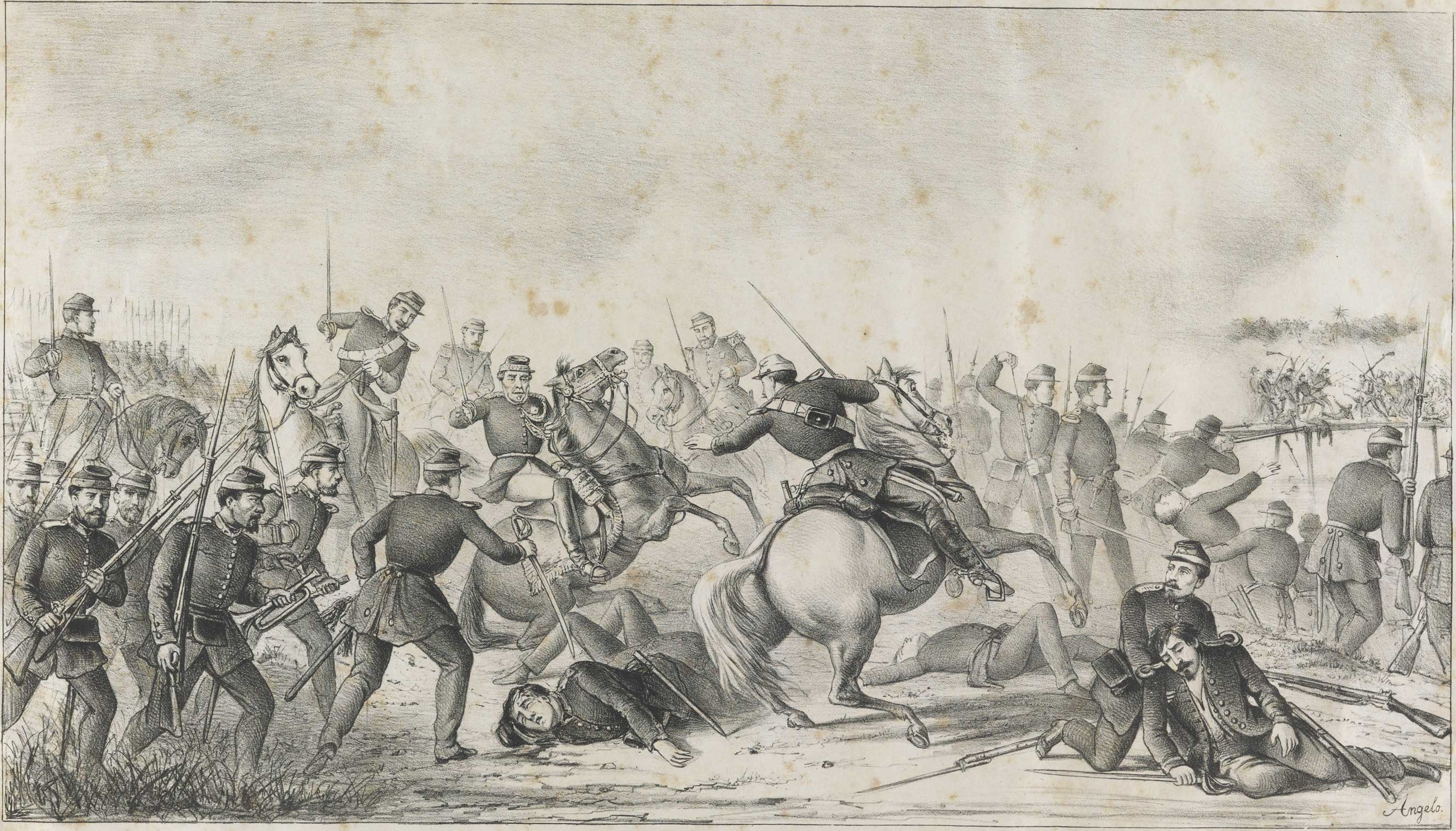
- Crossing of the bridge over the Ytororó River, one of the defining moments of the campaign
Date	August 1868 – January 1869
Location	Current Central Department, Paraguay
Result	Allied victory: Sacking of Asunción

Belligerents
Paraguay	Empire of Brazil; Argentina; Uruguay

Commanders and leaders
Francisco López; Francisco Resquín; Bernardino Caballero; (Paraguay) George Thompson; José Bado; José Montiel; Julián Roa; Germán Serrano; Valois Rivarola; Juan Lanson	Luís de Silva; Joaquim Lisboa; Manuel Osório; José Barreto; João Barreto; José Câmara; Salustiano Reis; (Empire of Brazil) Count of Eu; Alexandre Filho (WIA); João Sobrinho (WIA); Joaquim Neves (WIA); Fernando Machado †; Jacinto Bittencourt; Herculano Pedra; Secundino Tamborim; Domingos Seixas; Juan Obes; Wenceslao Paunero; Emilio Mitre; Enrique Castro

Strength
18,000; 30 guns	30,000 Brazilian soldiers 5,000 Argentine soldiers 1,000 Uruguayan soldiers 26 guns

Casualties and losses
11,066 total casualties	8,669 total casualties

The Pikysyry campaign was the Paraguayan War's fourth phase. It lasted from August 1868 to January 1869 and was a comprehensive Allied victory.

After success in the Mato Grosso campaign and failure in the Corrientes campaign, the Paraguayan Army was pushed back into Paraguay itself. After years of fighting around the formidable fortress of Humaitá, Allied pressure on the fortress's defensive line forced it to be abandoned; a new defensive line was set up around the Pikysyry River. The Paraguay River remained blocked by a new coastal battery in Angostura; it was, however, bypassed by the advancing Brazilian troops, who marched through the Paraguayan Chaco and attacked the Paraguayan positions from the rear, seizing them.

With the defeat of the Paraguayan army, Asunción, the capital, was occupied and sacked in January 1869. Over the following months, the war became an irregular conflict, as Allied forces chased Paraguayan president Francisco Solano López and his remaining troops over the countryside.

== Background ==
The Paraguayan War had begun in 1864, when Paraguayan troops invaded western Brazil in response to the Uruguayan War. Some months later, Paraguay would invade Argentina after said country did not allow the Paraguayan Army to cross its territory, which it needed to in order to aid allied Uruguay. Uruguay soon surrendered to Brazil, however, and a new government friendly to that nation was installed. That meant that Paraguay found itself at war with Argentina, Brazil and Uruguay, and was quickly forced into a defensive posture. For years, the conflict was centered around the Fortress of Humaitá, a formidable defensive structure which guarded the Paraguay River, until the Brazilian Navy managed to pass through the fortification; the Paraguayan troops then withdrew and dug into a new defensive line closer to Asunción, the capital, anchored by the Angostura fortress.

=== The Pikysyry line ===
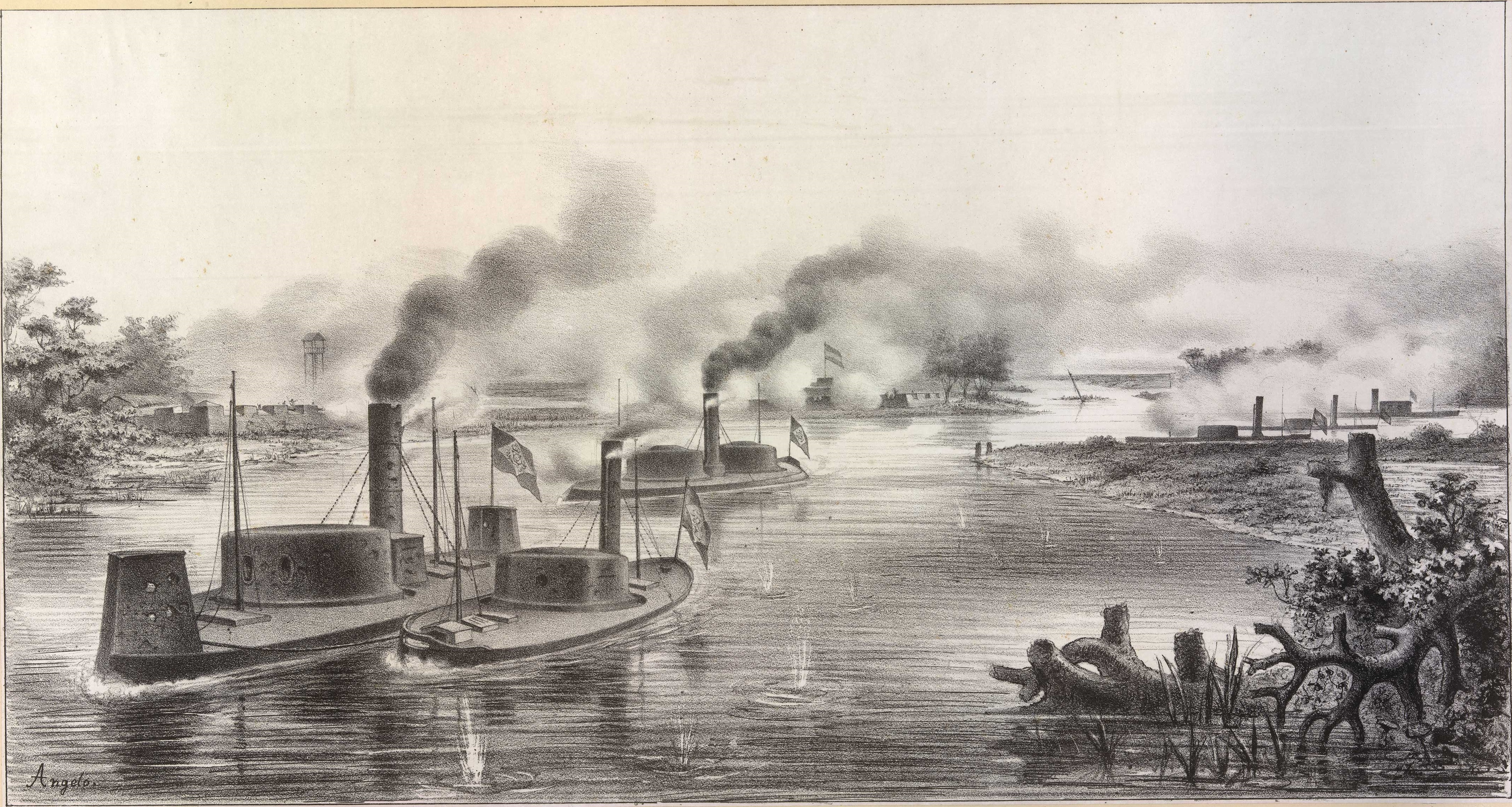
The Brazilian Navy advances, passing by the Paraguayan batteries on the Tebicuary River, on 23 July 1868 (A Vida Fluminense, No. 34, 1868).

After Humaitá was evacuated, various possibilities for a new defensive line were evaluated, and a new position was chosen behind the Pikysyry River. It began to be occupied in September 1868. This new position had several strengths: troops attacking it from the south (where the Allied army was positioned) would cross marshy, uninhabited and thorny terrain to reach it; it was anchored on its western end by a narrowing of the Pikysyry into the Paraguay River which is overlooked by a tall hill, Angostura. Any attackers who tried to flank the position would have to march across the hilly landscape that exists from Pikysyry to the north, which was also defensible. Consequently, the position was only exposed to attack through the narrow streams that crossed it. North of it was Villeta, an important settlement which served as a supply hub and port.

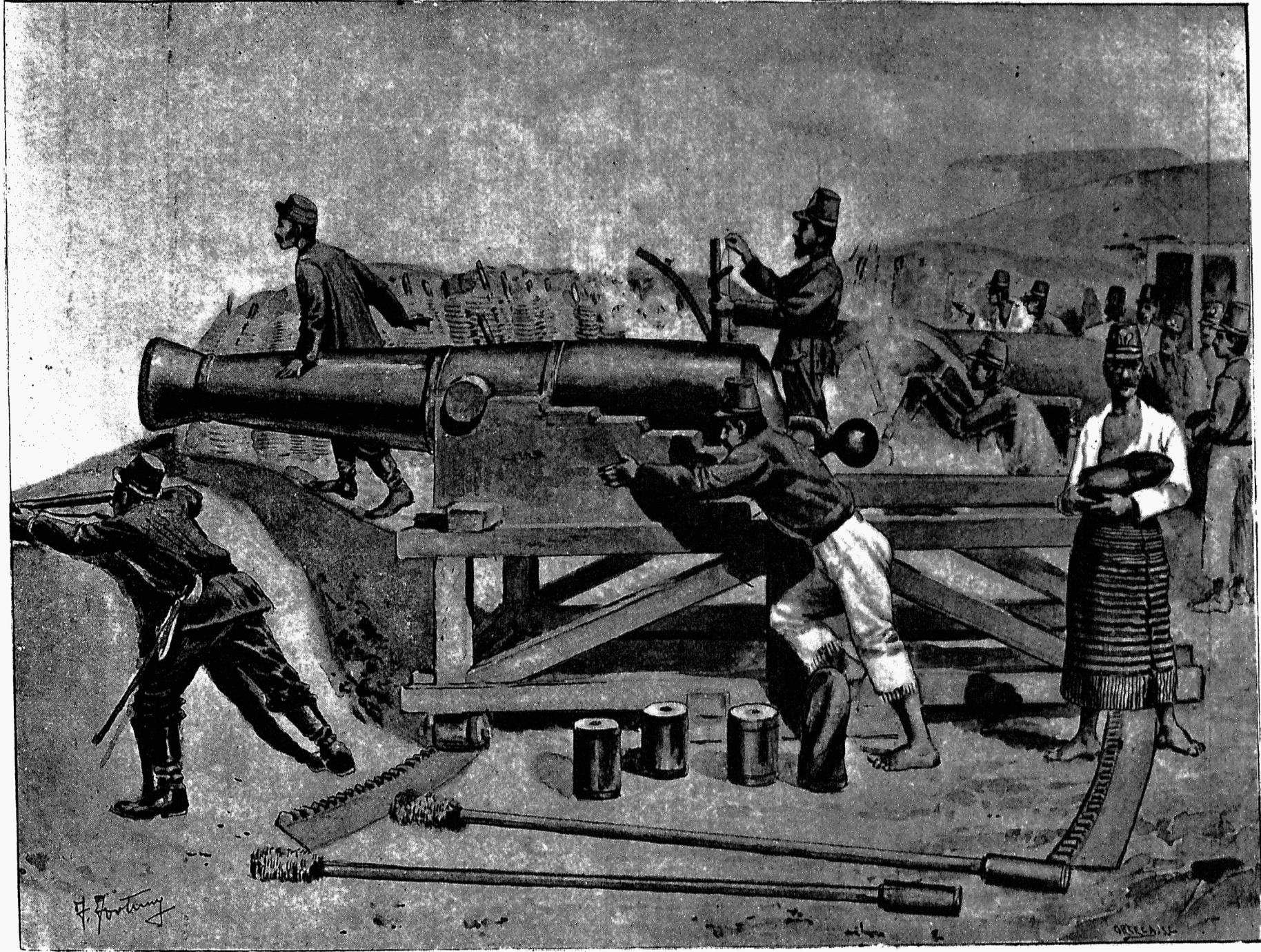
"El Criollo", a cannon, in battery. The two officers in sight are Commander Lucas Carrillo, Paraguayan, and George Thompson, an English engineer in Paraguayan service.

The position had a weakness, however: it was located only circa 35 kilometres (22 mi) away from Asunción. If it fell, or was surrounded, the capital would most likely be taken. In light of this, the Paraguayan government ordered the city to be evacuated; in February 1868 the government's administration had already been shifted to Luque, which, though still near the old capital, was not on the shore of the Paraguay River and thus less vulnerable. As the Allied army advanced, the capital would again be shifted on 18 December, this time to the much more easterly Piribebuy.

On Paraguayan president López's orders, Englishman George Thompson oversaw the building of a line of fortifications between the shore of the Paraguay River and the marshes around the Ypoá lagoon; the line extended for around 9 kilometres (5.6 mi), then. Close to the line's eastern end, there were two marshes, Ita Yvaté and Cumbarity, separated by a brook. López named the marshes Lomas Valentinas, and established his headquarters there; his house was set up in Cumbarity, in a spot where he could see most of the Pikysyry. The defensive line had 85 guns of various calibers, plus 18 more on Angostura, one of them being the 150-pounder Criollo. By December 1868, there were 12,000 men employed in its defense.

== The campaign ==
=== Humaitá to Palmas ===
In the Allied camp, the Marquis of Caxias, commander over all Brazilian forces, sent a request to Emperor Pedro II that peace be made with Paraguay, a request which was denied. The Emperor considered that political stability in Brazil now depended in a complete victory over Paraguay. In order to placate the Marquis, he allowed for all three Allied armies to operate independently of each other, which crucially meant that Brazil (which had the largest force in the theater, by far) now could conduct operations without consulting Argentina and Uruguay. Caxias thought that the Argentine commander, Juan Andrés Gelly y Obes, was profiting from the continuation of the war.

On 19 August, the Brazilian army, with its allies in tow, started its march to the north from Humaitá and seven days later won a battle against the forward Paraguayan positions at Yacaré.

The geography was very unfavorable to the attackers, muddy, wet and constantly rainy, with abundant insects. On 23 September, they reached a stream, Surubí-i, that was defended by Paraguayan troops under Colonel Julián Roa. The Brazilians managed to dislodge them; by the next day, they had taken the minor port of Palmas. From it, Caxias was able to see the Paraguayan fortifications; Angostura blocked the Paraguay River further upstream, and they were nigh impervious to frontal assaults due to the lines being built against the Pikysyry, which had been dammed by the Paraguayans and was unfordable.

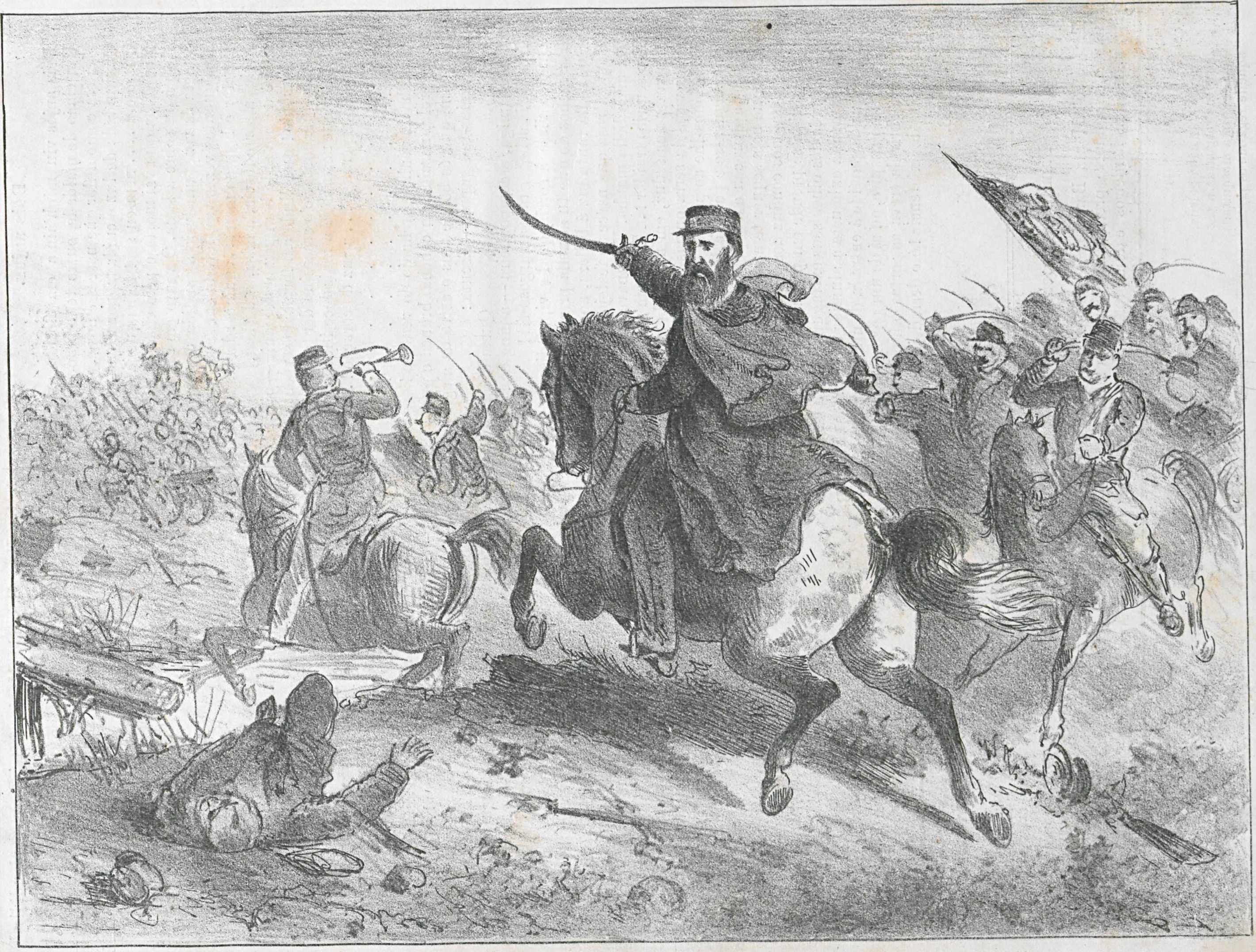
The Baron of Triunfo at the combat over the Surubí-i stream in 26 September 1868.

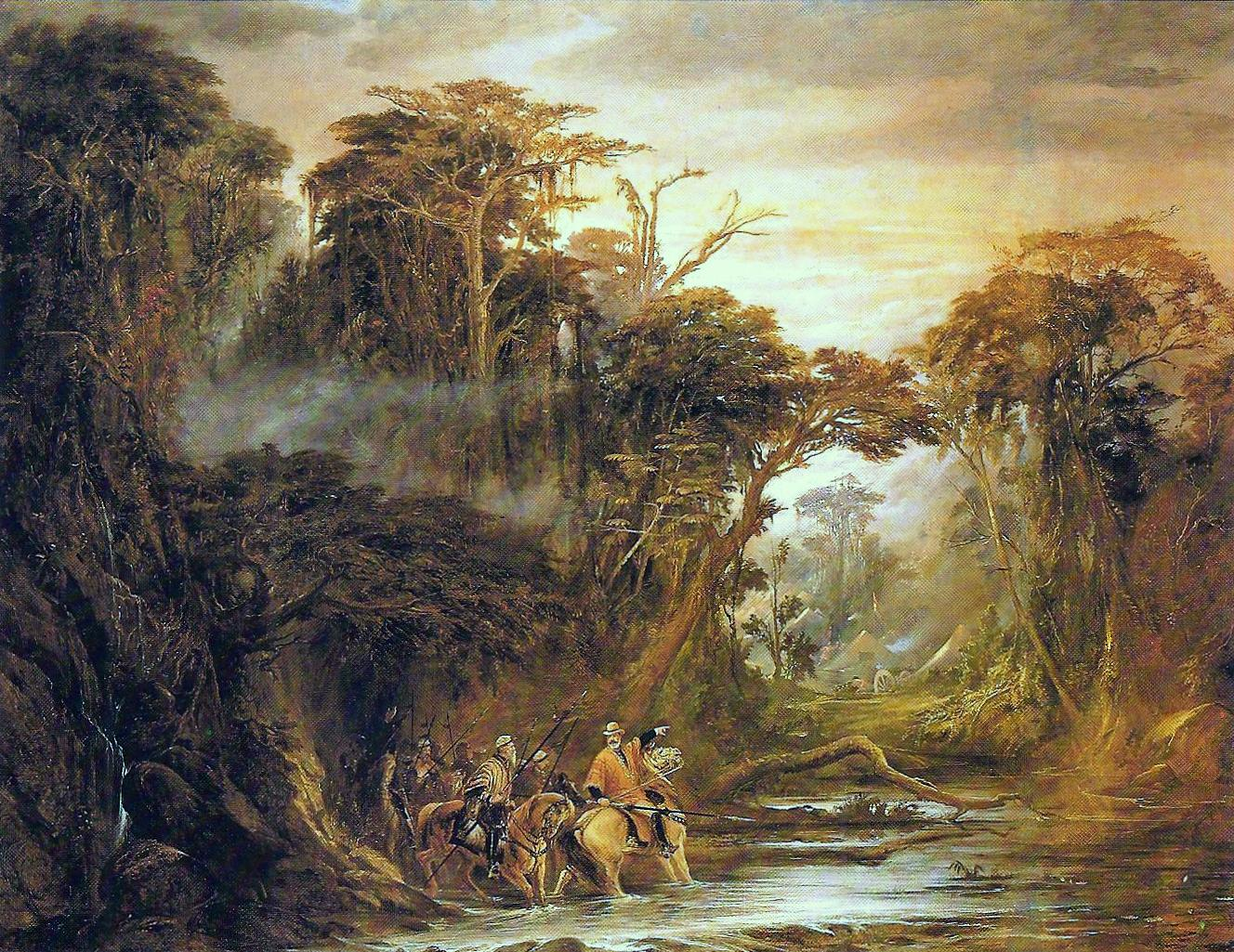
The Brazilians march through the Chaco.

=== Maneuver through the Chaco ===
Due to the allies' lack of geographical knowledge about the Paraguayan interior, they thought that lake Ypoá extended to the north enough to encounter the eastern limit to the Paraguayan line at Pikysyry, something which led them to discard the idea of circling the defensive positions by that route. Two options remained: to take a wider route away from the lake, crossing through completely unknown and presumably populated territory, and from there strike at Asunción, or to simply ignore the Paraguayan positions and land troops between them and Asunción. The first option was discarded due to the imagined supply difficulties from being away from their logistical structure for an unknown amount of time; the second would have seen a strong force remaining at Palmas to pin the enemy in place, and circa 20,000 men embarking in the Brazilian fleet to go upriver, in a night operation, while part of the fleet bombarded the still incomplete Angostura fort.

While Caxias saw the necessity of flanking the Paraguayan position, he felt that underestimating Angostura's guns was a bad idea: though they probably would prove to be no challenge to the Brazilian ironclads, these were not designed to ferry troops, and the ships that could ferry them would be vulnerable to the fort's guns. Besides this, there was doubt on the navy's capacity to ferry all the troops necessary for the operation in a single movement.

Caxias then raised a third possibility. In order to avoid Angostura, the troops would march through the swampy Chaco, on the other side of the Paraguay River, and support the main offensive against the Paraguayan position with a landing at Villeta. Most of the Brazilian ironclads were ordered to cross Angostura, something done on 5 October under the command of Delfim Carlos de Carvalho, Baron of Passagem, who had commanded the similarly complex Passage of Humaitá. The squadron advanced until Asunción, bombarded the city briefly, and returned to Villeta, where it anchored behind some river islands so as to be protected from the Paraguayan guns. On 8 October, a Brazilian ship crossed downriver from Villeta, bringing a report from Carvalho. They had reconnoitered the river up to Asunción, and seen that there were no forts or batteries in its shores, excepting Villeta, which was fortified. On the 9th, that ship returned upriver, together with another two ironclads, with only the troopships remaining downriver. Overall, the manouvre implied a great challenge; at that time of the year, much of the Chaco was flooded and rains were constant.

An idea from Gelly y Obes to maintain a force in Palmas to pin the Paraguayan army in its place was kept; Caxias was suspicious, however, of his intentions, and, supposedly aiming to keep the glory from the victory to himself and the Empire, attributed this task to the Argentine army exclusively; only Brazilian troops were transported through the Chaco, despite Gelly y Obes insisting otherwise, which was a controversial decision; The Argentine general's advice to disembark the troops in San Antonio rather than Villeta was heeded, however, given that the latter port was fortified. The troops that remained at Palmas were 6,500 Argentine men, 800 Uruguayans and 3,200 Brazilians between an infantry brigade (the Paranhos Brigade), a mounted artillery regiment, a transport troop, engineers and other support sections, adding up to a total of about 10,500 men.

By October 1868 the reconnaissance for and construction of a road in the Chaco began. The Brazilian ironclads eventually disembarked some troops in San Antonio and then remained there in support, waiting for the army to emerge from the Chaco. The road that ended up being built was circa 25 kilometres (16 mi) long, and it took a month to be ready. The traverse of the army through the road took 48 hours, and then they reembarked. The force was between 20,000 and 30,000 men in strength. Donato cites a figure of 20,657 men, amongst them 18,999 infantrymen, 926 cavalrymen and 742 artillerymen. They were divided in three corps, the First under Jacinto Machado Bittencourt, the Second under Alexandre Gomes de Argolo Ferrão Filho, Viscount of Itaparica and the Third under Manuel Luís Osório, Marquis of Erval; overall command was held by Caxias, who installed his command post in San Antonio. Though they were close to Asunción, they marched south towards the Paraguayan army and López. This would later be known as the Pikysyry maneuver.

=== The Dezembrada ===
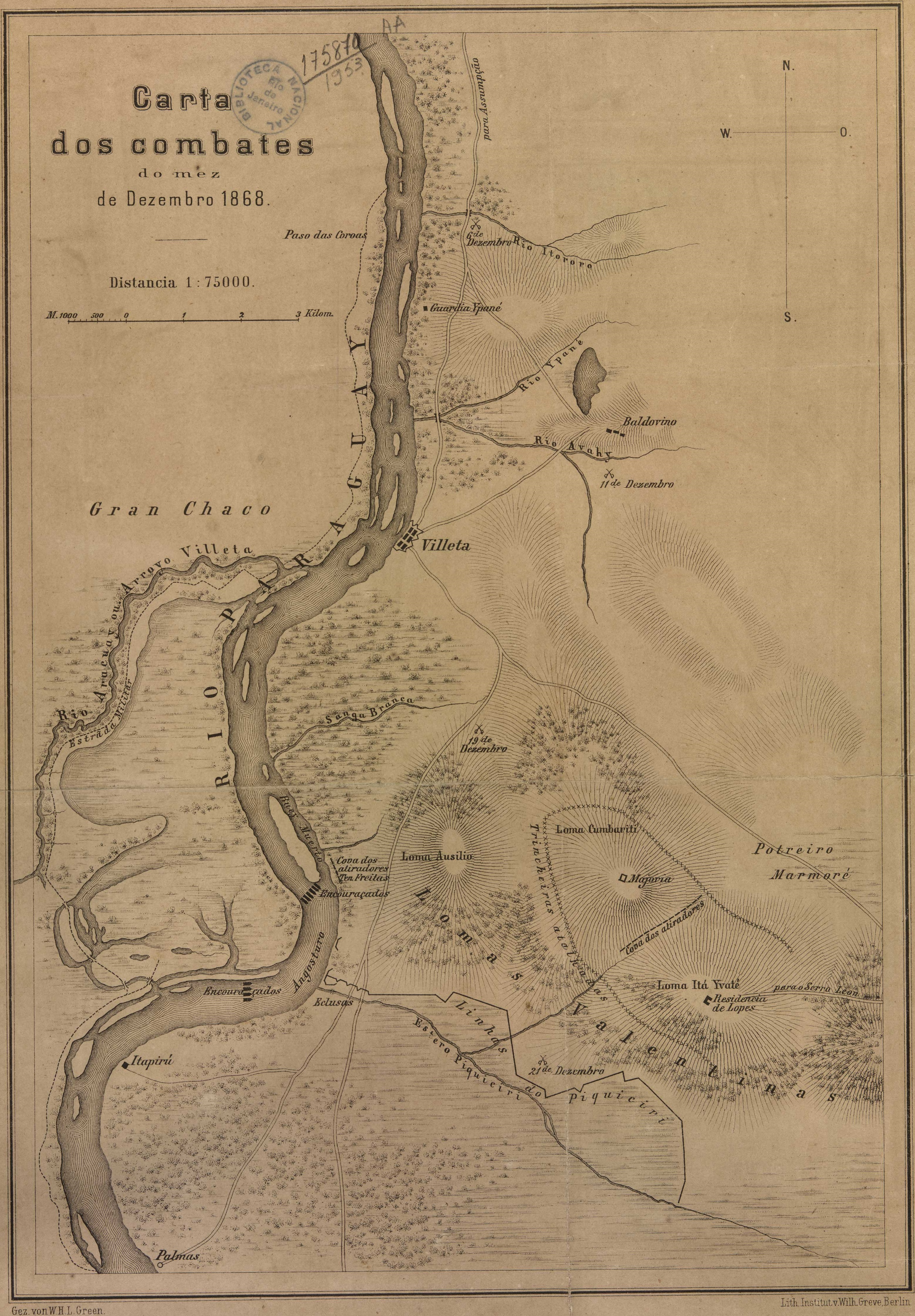
Map of the fighting in December 1868.

The Brazilian force disembarked on 4 December 1868, beginning the Dezembrada. (Note: After the month of December, which in Portuguese is Dezembro.) 6 kilometres (3.7 mi) to the south of San Antonio, the coastal road crossed a stream, Ytororó, by a narrow bridge. On the other side of the bridge a small garrison laid waiting for the Brazilian force; the defenders delayed them long enough for 5,000 men under General Bernardino Caballero to arrive, reinforcing the position. Though eventually the attackers managed to dislodge the Paraguayan troops, they suffered 1,900 casualties doing so; the Paraguayans also suffered heavy casualties, 1,400 men, a larger proportion of their force engaged in the field. The Paraguayans did not manage to withdraw to their defensive line, however; on the 11th, they were forced to stand at the Avay stream, a similar position to Ytororó except for being easier to encircle. As it rained, the Paraguayans' matchlocks were unable to fire. Soon after the battle started, the Brazilian cavalry charged the rear of the Paraguayan position, crushing the defending force, which suffered massive 3,600 casualties to the allies' 1,600 over a mere five hours of heavy fighting. Only 50 men managed to escape to the Pikysyry line, including Caballero.

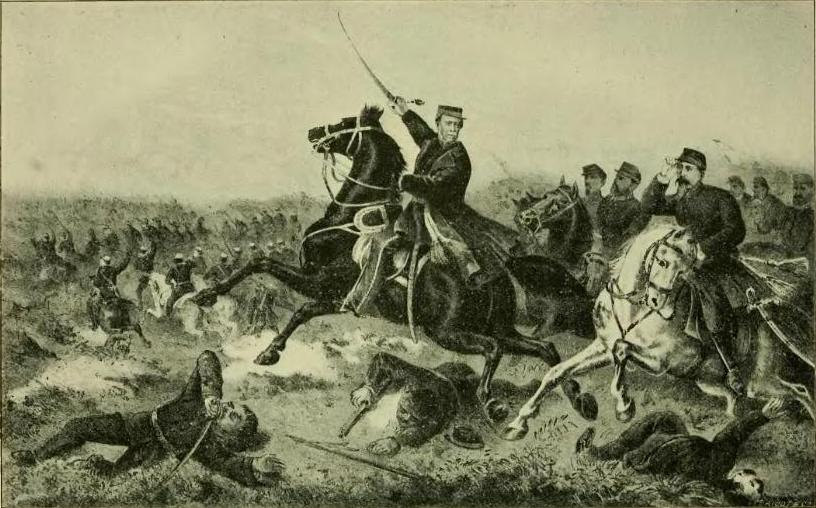
The Marquis of Caxias leads his men at the Battle of Lomas Valentinas.

On 17 December, the Imperial 3rd Cavalry Division under Colonel Vasco Alves Pereira attacked the Paraguayan 45th and 20th Cavalry Regiments, which managed to retreat despite suffering heavy losses. On the 18th, the Paraguayan position in Lomas Valentinas was reconnoitered and Caxias defined his plan of attack, based on two slopes that approached the position, which happened to be fortified. On the 21st, López ordered most of the men condemned in the mock-trials at San Fernando to be shot, including his brother Benigno López, General Vicente Barrios, Bishop Palacios, former foreign minister José Berges, amongst others. In the same day, Caxias ordered the Paraguayan position to be attacked, in the Battle of Lomas Valentinas, which ended up being extended into the 27th of the same month. On the 24th, a message had been sent to López, bidding him to surrender; his reply was negative, reminding his enemies of his rejected peace offer in Yataytí Corá two years earlier. Both sides suffered circa 3,000 casualties, but the Paraguayan army was destroyed. López, surprisingly, managed to flee the battle despite the complete encirclement of his position by the Allied forces.

In view of the complete Allied victory, George Thompson, who had been left in command of the Angostura Fortress, surrendered it on 30 December, leading 1,700 men into captivity.

== Aftermath ==
The Dezembrada was hugely successful for the Allied armies. Over a single month, at the cost of 10,000 Allied casualties, the Paraguayan Army had been dealt a death blow, taking close to 20,000 casualties. That force, which had managed to oppose them for years at that point, was destroyed in the field, with only López and his entourage remaining active; this success was such that Caxias left Paraguay soon after. After Asunción was taken in January 1869, all major operations in the field were momentarily stopped, with the Allied armies and officer corps exhausted, something which allowed the Paraguayans time to form another army out of the remaining population in the interior of the country.

Caxias was eventually replaced by Gaston, Count of Eu, the Emperor's son-in-law. While a new government for Paraguay was created in Asunción under orders from José Paranhos, Viscount of Rio Branco, the chief Brazilian diplomat in the country, campaigning resumed in the interior. In August 1869, the Campaign of the Hills began; it was the war's final phase, as both it and the war ended in March 1870 when López was killed at the Battle of Cerro Corá after a grueling guerrilla campaign.
