= João Niederauer Sobrinho =

Brazilian colonel (1827-1868)

- Born: 4 April 1827; Três Forquilhas, Rio Grande do Sul, Brazil
- Died: 13 December 1868 (aged 41); Villeta Hospital, Paraguay
- Military career
- Allegiance: Empire of Brazil
- Branch: Imperial Brazilian Army
- Service years: 1851–1868
- Rank: Colonel
- Conflicts: Platine War; Uruguayan War; Siege of Paysandú; Paraguayan War; Pikysyry campaign; Battle of Yacaré; Battle of Ytororó; Battle of Avay (WIA)

João Niederauer Sobrinho (4 April 1827 – 13 December 1868) was a Brazilian colonel of the Platine War and the Paraguayan War. He was notable for his service in the Pikysyry campaign, having a previous origin as a notable citizen from Santa Maria, Rio Grande do Sul. Commanding the Cavalry Brigade of the II Corps, he died of wounds sustained during the Battle of Avay two days after the battle.

== Early life ==
Niederauer was born on 4 April 1827, as the son of German immigrants Philipp Leonard Niederauer and Catharina Diehl Niederauer in the German-Brazilian community of Três Forquilhas (modern-day Itati). He was baptized on 14 April 1827, by Pastor Carl Leopold Voges, having as godfather his homonymous uncle João Niederauer, at the time installed with a commercial house next to Baluarte Ipiranga, in Vila de Torres.

Due to the rising tensions that would eventually lead to the Ragamuffin War, the entire Niederauer family moved to São Leopoldo and to Santa Maria around 1840, allowing Niederauer to receive an excellent school education. There he started to work in his father's tannery and saddlery until he traveled to São Borja on business but he then returned in 1847. In 1849, Niederauer enlisted in the National Guard of Santa Maria and on 9 January 1850, he was promoted to Lieutenant and integrated into the 12th Squadron of the Cavalry Corps in Santa Maria.

From then on, he started to work with his uncle and godfather João Niederauer, whose daughter, Maria Catharina, would later get married with Niederauer Sobrinho on 21 September 1852. They would later had six children: Delfina, João, Gabriela, José Gabriel, Afonso and Adelaide. The commercial house where he worked was located on the modern-day Rua Venâncio Aires.

== Military career ==
In 1851, war broke out against Manuel Oribe and Juan Manuel de Rosas, the Argentine caudillos who challenged Brazilian interests in the Platine region. João Niederauer at the age of 23, volunteered and was appointed Lieutenant of the 1st Cavalry Corps of the National Guard of the District of Santa Maria. Upon returning from the campaign, he was awarded the silver medal with a green ribbon for outstanding services and was soon promoted to captain.

His stay at home was short-lived and as early as March 1854, just 3 months after the birth of his firstborn, Delfina, Captain Niederauer was called to join his Squadron of the Santa Mariense National Guard which was part of the Imperial Auxiliary Division. The squadron was sent to Uruguay at the request of the Government to pacify the internal struggles. Upon returning to Santa Maria in 1855, he was already one of the most influential citizens of his community, which at that time was striving for the political emancipation of Cachoeira do Sul.

He returned to active service in 1857 and 1858 within the 4th Cavalry Corps of the National Guard which was part of the Observation Army in the Ibicuí River, in charge of guarding the borders with the countries of the Río de la Plata, then in constant political-military turmoil. Probably for this reason, he ceased to participate in the City Council that installed the new Vila de Santa Maria da Boca do Monte on May 17, 1858.

On May 30, 1860, he was promoted to Lieutenant Colonel of the 41st Cavalry Corps of the National Guard, based in Santa Maria. On September 7 of the same year, he was elected to the 2nd Chamber of Councilors of Santa Maria with the third highest number of votes, for a term of 4 years. During his term, he held for long periods the position of President of the Chamber, who at the time was also the Chief of the Municipal Executive Branch.

In the following elections on September 7, 1864, he was the most voted councilor but stopped taking office due to the outbreak of the Uruguayan War and Niederauer was called for active service again. He left his home, his family and his adopted land for the last time. Maria Catharina was pregnant with their last child, Adelaide, whom he would never get to know.

In the Campaign against Aguirre, Niederauer commanded the 7th Provisional Cavalry Corps, formed by volunteers from Santa Maria. On January 2, 1865, the regiment participated in the Siege of Paysandú and the siege of Montevideo, which capitulated on February 21 of the same year.

== Paraguayan War ==
The hopes of Niederauer's brave cavalrymen of returning home were frustrated, as a new and bloodier war was being drawn in the swamps of Paraguay. Capture of the steamer Marquês de Olinda and the invasion of the Brazilian province of Mato Grosso and the Argentine province of Corrientes by Paraguayan forces gave rise to the Treaty of the Triple Alliance and the consequent declaration of war on Paraguay.

On May 18, 1866, he was promoted to Colonel and appointed Superior Commander of the National Guard of Santa Maria da Boca do Monte and São Martinho, replacing Colonel José Alves Valença, who was killed at Corrientes. During the war, he commanded the 3rd Cavalry Brigade and the 2nd Cavalry Division. In this campaign, he enriched Brazilian Military History with pages of heroism and bravery. In addition to the recognition and admiration of his superiors, by whom he was often officially praised, and the esteem and respect of his subordinates, who almost deified him, Niederauer was awarded the Order of the Rose, for bravery in the battlefield, after the Battle of Tuyutí and the Order of the Southern Cross, also for bravery on April 2, 1868.

After participating in 14 engagements and 2 battles at the head of his cavalrymen from Santa Maria, Colonel Niederauer was mortally wounded by a spear when coordinating the collection of the dead and wounded after the Battle of Avay on December 11, 1868. He would die two days later in the Hospital of Villeta and was buried nearby. His remains weren't identified for a long time until they were recovered by his great-great-grandson, Juan Farinolli Niederauer and they were repatriated at his home state of Rio Grande do Sul.

== Legacy ==
Niederauer was the subject of numerous honors in his adopted city. Considered to be the most notable military hero in Santa Maria, a monument was erected to him in the city center in 1922 during the Centenary of Independence of Brazil. In addition, one of the most important streets leading to the city center from the west was named after him.

The Brazilian Army honored him on the centenary of his death in 1968, naming the Vila Militar on Avenida Borges de Medeiros after him and in 1992, enshrining him as the Patron of the 6th Armored Infantry Brigade whose headquarters, as well as 11 of its 14 military organizations, are in Santa Maria.

The two columns of the loft, which decorate the graduation patio of the Headquarters of the 6th Armored Infantry Brigade, symbolize the bases of the military profession which Niederauer was described as having hierarchy and discipline. On top of them, the capital represents the sacrifice of life itself.
