= Battle of Avay =

1868 battle of the Paraguayan War

- Part of the Pikysyry campaign
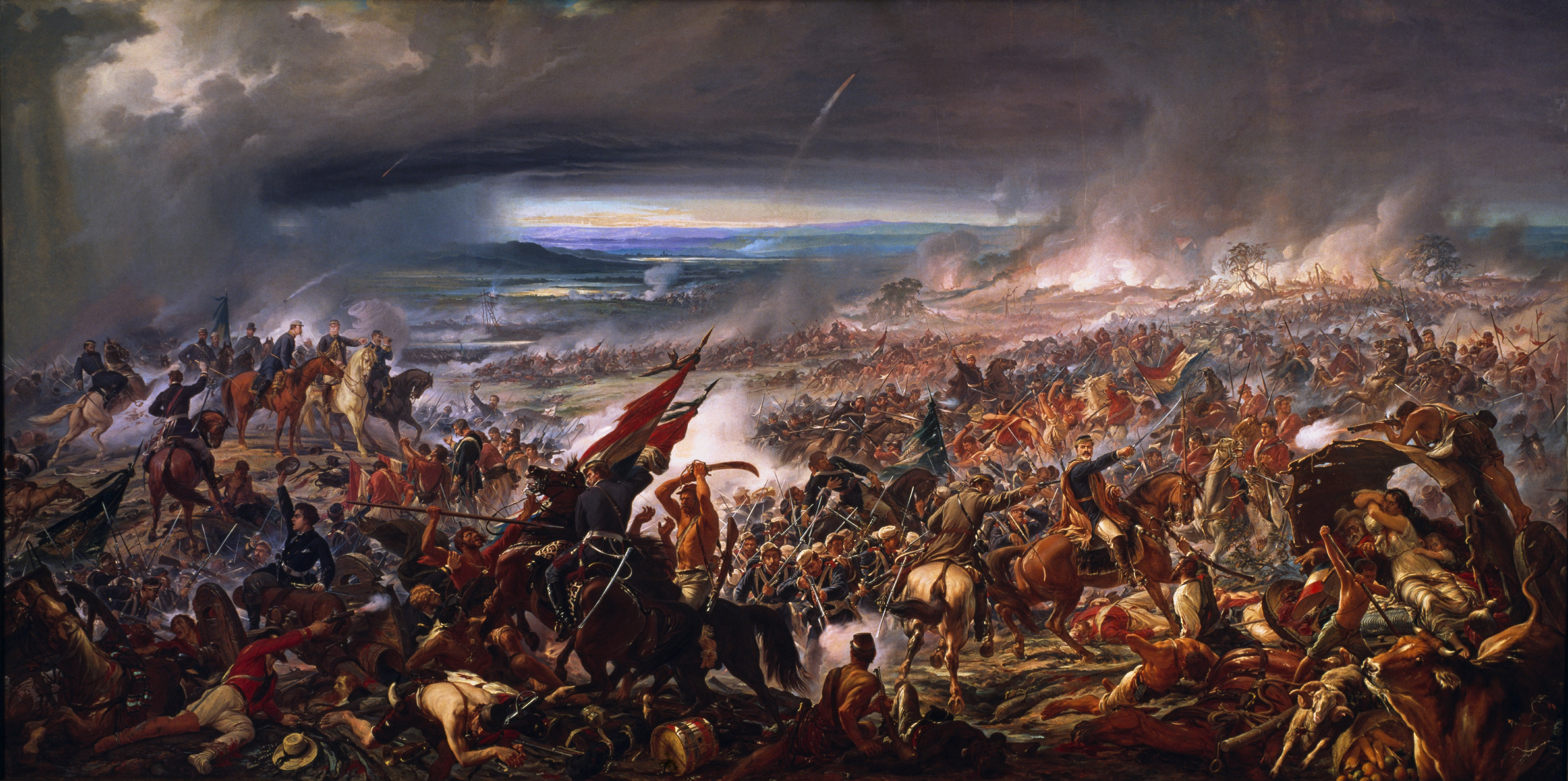
- Batalha do Avaí by Pedro Américo
Date	11 December 1868
Location	Avay stream, Paraguay
Result	Brazilian victory

Belligerents
Empire of Brazil	Paraguay

Commanders and leaders
Marquess of Caxias	Bernardino Caballero

Strength
18,963 and 26 guns	5,000 and 18 guns

Casualties and losses
1,663: 297 killed 1,366 wounded	3,600: 3,000 killed 600 wounded

The Battle of Avay of 11 December 1868 was one of the last major combat engagements of the Paraguayan War, fought near the Avay stream in Paraguayan territory between the forces the Triple Alliance and the Paraguayan Army.

== Background ==
The battle was fought during a period of the war in which the Allied forces fought and won a number of battles while marching south in an attempt at taking Pikysyry from the rear. In March 1868, most of the Paraguayan forces abandoned the Fortress of Humaitá, under Francisco Solano López's command, in order to set up a defence line in the margins of the Tebicuary river. The fortress was left under command of Paraguayan colonel Francisco Martínez.

While the 2nd Corps of the Imperial Brazilian Army began surrounding Humaitá, the 1st and 3rd Corps, alongside a Uruguayan division, followed the command of the Marquis of Caxias and began chasing the Paraguayan Army. López, however, left his new position near the Tebicuary as well, in order to defend the Pikysyry lines, 130 kilometres (80 mi) to the south of the capital, Asunción, and 200 kilometres (120 mi) to the north of Humaitá. The Allied march was slowed, giving López enough time to reinforce the Pikysyry lines.

The week prior to the battle of Avay, the Paraguayan vanguard, under the command of general Bernardino Caballero, clashed with the Brazilian Army in the battle of Ytororó. After the fight, Paraguayan forces retreated towards Villeta, crossing the Ypané river and camping in a fortified spot, where their troops could gather their strength in relative safety and prepare for a new battle.

== Battle ==
The Allied advance stopped where the road crossed the Avay stream. For the Allied army, the vanguard consisted of the 3rd Corps, commanded by general Manuel Luís Osório, the 2nd Corps under general José Luís Mena Barreto, which formed the center, and the 1st Corps under general Jacinto Machado de Bittencourt, which formed the rear guard. The Marquis of Caxias also had available the Cavalry Divisions, including the 1st under General João Manuel Mena Barreto, the 5th under colonel José Antonio Correia da Câmara, and the 2nd and 3rd under General Joaquim de Andrade Neves. The battle began at noon and lasted for five hours.

The flanking attacks by the 1st, 2nd, and 3rd Cavalry Divisions into the Paraguayan rear made escape impossible. With the total defeat of general Caballero's forces, Caxias reached Villeta. The Paraguayan survivors, fewer than 50, retreated to Lomas Valentinas, where López had assembled 3,000 troops, plus another 2,000 at Pikysyry, and 700 at Angostura.

López ordered the evacuation of Asunción to the provisional capital of Piribebuy.
