= Alexandre Gomes de Argolo Ferrão Filho, Viscount of Itaparica =

Brazilian general (1821–1870)

The Viscount of Itaparica
- Born: Alexandre Gomes de Argolo Ferrão Filho; 8 August 1821; Salvador, Bahia, Brazil
- Died: 23 June 1870 (aged 48); Bahia, Brazil
- Military career
- Allegiance: Empire of Brazil
- Branch: Imperial Brazilian Army
- Service years: 1837–1870
- Rank: Marshal
- Conflicts: Balaiada; Paraguayan War; Humaitá campaign; Battle of Tuyutí; Pikysyry campaign; Battle of Ytororó (WIA); Pikysyry campaign; Pikysyry maneuver

Alexandre Gomes de Argolo Ferrão Filho (Note: In the old spelling: Alexandre Gomes de Argollo Ferrão Filho.) (8 Augusto 1821 – 23 June 1870) was a Brazilian Marshal of the Balaiada and the Paraguayan War. He commanded the 1st Division of the Imperial Brazilian Army and primarily participated in the Battle of Tuyutí and the Battle of Ytororó. He was one of the main figures behind the Pikysyry maneuver and is often credited for the maneuver along with the Duke of Caxias but he would die months later after the war's conclusion from his injuries during service.

== Origins ==
Alexandre was born out of wedlock as the son of Alexandre Gomes de Argolo Ferrão, Baron of Cajaíba, on 8 August 1821. Argolo is of Spanish descent as his descendants can trace their origins to the initial colonization of Brazil under Tomé de Sousa and they had historically settled in Salvador, Bahia.

== Military career ==
He entered military service on 2 December 1837, as a cadet within the 1st Artillery Battalion and was promoted to Second Lieutenant by the next year. His first active military service was during the repression of the Balaiada in 1840. After this, he was promoted to captain in 1844 and awarded the Order of the Rose as a Knight in 1847. He was also awarded the Knight of the Order of Aviz in 1849 and promoted to Major in 1852. He was then given command of the Bahia National Guard from 1854 to 1855 and was promoted to Lieutenant Colonel in 1859.

When the Paraguayan War broke out, he was given command of the 2nd Army Corps under the order of the Duke of Caxias. During his service in the war, the Duke of Caxias ordered the Argolo Ferrão Battalion to construct the Grão-Chaco Road which would improve Brazilian navigation within the Gran Chaco. When asked about the probability of such a task, Argolo responded with: "Marshal! If it's possible, it's done! If it's impossible, we'll do it!" Around this time, he participated in the Battle of Tuyutí and the Battle of Ytororó where he would be wounded in the latter. Antônio Loureiro de Souza, referring to the Viscount's bravery, stated:

The great Caxias with whom he served, held him in high regard, never getting tired of praising him on various orders of the day. Thus, he knew how to be a great patriot, one of those who, through fearlessness and patriotism, were inscribed in national history.

In 1869, he left Paraguay and on 23 June 1870, he died as a result of the wound he suffered during the Battle of Ytororó. At the time of his death, Argolo had reached the rank of Marshal. Currently, in the city of Barreiras, Bahia, the 19th Hunters Battalion named after him.
