= San Antonio, Paraguay =

San Antonio
- City

- Location within Paraguay
- Coordinates: 25°22′47″S 57°36′35″W
- Country: Paraguay
- Department: Central
- Founded: 1903

Government
  - Intendente Municipal: Raúl Mendoza
- Elevation: 57 m (187 ft)

Population (2016)
  - Total: 62,663
  - Density: 15/km^{2} (39/sq mi)
- Time zone: -4 Gmt
- Postal code: 2650
- Area code: (595) (21)
- Climate: Cfa

San Antonio is a city in Paraguay located in the Central Department. It has been significant since colonial times, as it was located beside the Royal Way, a road which leads to the city of Villeta. Today, it is experiencing great industrial growth.

== History ==
Some historians claim that the town was begun by Dr Gaspar Rodríguez de Francia (1814–1840), who established a fortress to defend the Paraguayan territory. Others say the town began around 1679. In 1782 the Franciscan Missionaries founded an Indian town in the area with donations of the neighbors of Asunción. San Antonio may have been founded in 1890 by the German citizen Gustavo Conrado Gotees (born Conrad Götz in Schnabelwald, Germany).

San Antonio was important in the Paraguayan War (1864–1870). Brazilian troops arrived in its ports, en route to the historical battle of Ytororó in December 1868. After the war San Antonio was empty. In 1903 the Paraguayan citizen Agustin Quiñónez moved there, and promoted the city; this was a second foundation of the town. A few families of French, Italian, German and Spanish origins came to settle.

== Geography ==
=== Location ===
San Antonio is located on the Paraguay River, latitude 25 38 and longitude 57 63 in the south center 25 km from the capital, Asunción. In the north it is bordered by the districts of Ñemby and Villa Elisa, in the south with Ypané, in the east with Ñemby and in the west with the Paraguay River.

There are 17 neighborhoods: San Francisco, Mbocayaty, Pueblo, San Blas, Ma. Auxiliadora, Naranjaty, Antigua Imagen, San Jorge, Acosta Ñu, Achucarro, Cerrito, San Agustín, Amanecer, Las Garzas, La Merced, Cerrito, and Achucarro.

=== Climate ===
The river affects the weather, making the nights and early mornings fresh, and the days very hot. Temperatures range between 25 and 36 °C (77 and 97 °F) in summer, and in winter between 8 and 12 °C (46 and 54 °F).

=== Flora ===
In the city there are a great variety of trees such as the tajy or lapacho, trébol, pine, eucalyptus, cedar laurel and palm. The most important forest reservation is the Parque Ytororó.

== Politics ==
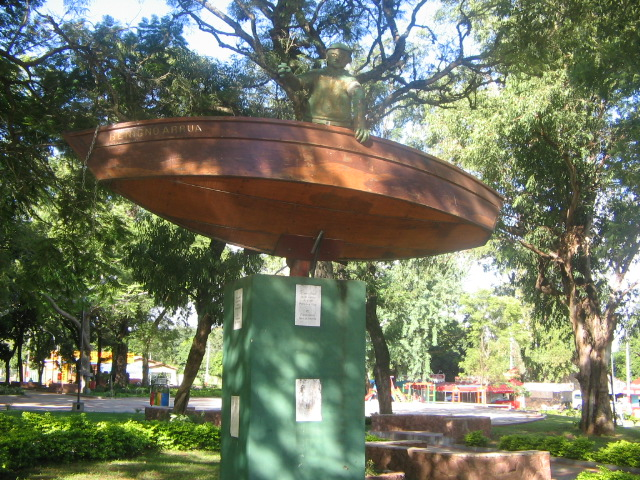
Statue honoring Don Benigno Arrua

On March 16, 1981, San Antonio was ascended to the category of city. Its first mayor was Francisco Bogado Caballero. On April 21, 1903, the Senate and the Congress issued a law declaring the community a District.

== Demographics ==
More than 50% of the population is between 15 and 45 years of age.

== Education and health care ==
The city has both private and public schools. There are 11 national schools amount and 10 private ones dedicated to elementary teaching. There are three national high schools and two private ones.

The Health Center was founded in 1978 by Higinio Mendoza and Luis Medina. Around 15 babies are delivered each month. Between 35 and 40 patients are seen per week and the emergency service is available 24 hours. The Instituto de Previción Social I.P.S has a peripheral presence in the city.

== Industries ==
There are many industries in this young city. Business include tanning and alcohol production. Some communication companies are located in this city, offering both cellular and radial communication.

=== International Products Corporation ===
The first industry that was established in the city was the International Products Corporation (IPC) slaughterhouse, which was the primary employer in San Antonio and other towns in the area. Founded May 30, 1917, it was a slaughterhouse for cattle, pigs and goats, with facilities to prepare and refrigerate with modern equipment. In the first year the company exported 73,443 boxes of refrigerated meat. Two refrigerated ships were bought, the Paraguay and the Ytororo.

A siren sounded daily at 2 AM for about 20 minutes so that the workers get ready to begin the work day at 3 AM. The company had a villa for 1,400 employees, with a communal kitchen and laundry. They also had a recreational center for the employees, which provided space for social activities. In the 1960s many soccer teams were located there, including Cerro Porteño, Guaraní, Sol de America, Libertad and Sportivo Luqueño.

In 1978 the company was closed. Years later, it was bought by industrialist Don Alberto Antebi, and production restarted on January 12, 1981, with modern equipment, Israel is one of the main customers.

=== Ports ===
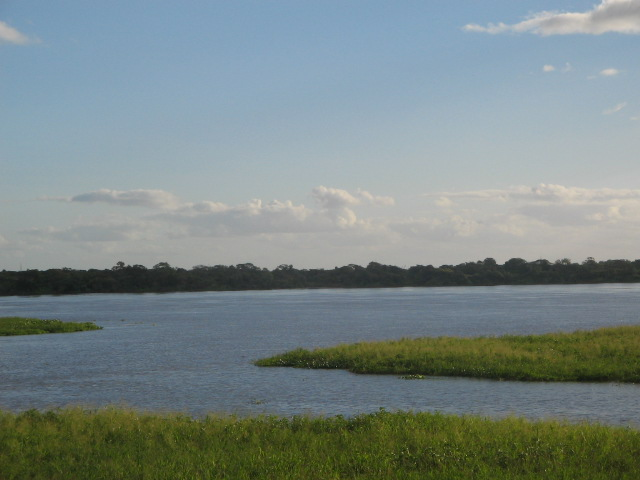
View of the Rio Paraguay

In 1926 the first port was opened to export fruit. The port was named Puerto Naranja, as there was a large orange plantation nearby which provided much of the fruit exported through this port.

From the 1950s through the 1990s, Puerto Minera was used for shipping stones from Cerro Ñemby, which were used to pave the streets of Puerto Pilcomayo.

The Port of San Antonio is currently the largest grain port in Paraguay.

=== Fishing ===
Because it is located on the banks of the Paraguayan River, fishing is an important activity, The river has many varieties of fish ranging from dorado, pacu, tres puntos, corvina, piraña, palometa, Anguilla de rio, armado, and surubí.

== Sport clubs and other organizations ==
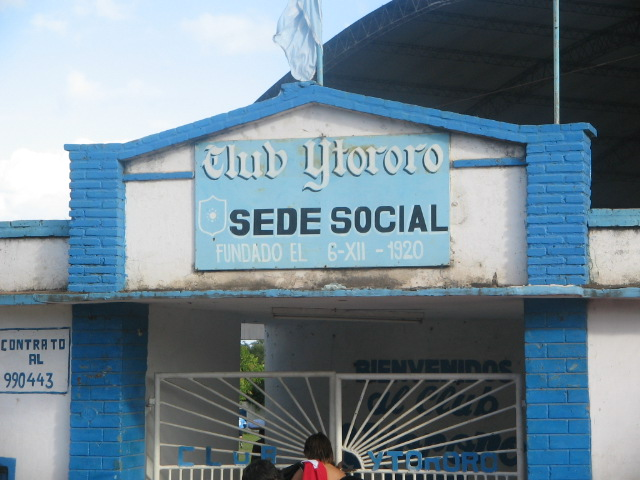
Club Ytororó

San Antonio has many sport clubs which are members of the Regional League of Paraguay. Clubs include Club Porvenir, Club Ytororó, Club Coronel Romero, Club 1er de Marzo, and Club Unión.

It has a Fire Squad of volunteers, belonging to the 13th company; the first ones joined on December 14, 2002. The Boy Scouts has a facility that opened in 1999. The security of the population is in the hands of the National Police of Precinct 24.

== Means of communication ==
San Antonio has two community radio stations: Radios San Pablo FM and San Antonio FM. It has a post office and telecommunications.

== Festivals ==
The main celebration of San Antonio is in June. It is very picturesque because it takes place on the beach on the Paraguayan River. It is celebrated with many flowers, colorful balloons and other ornaments in the streets. In the morning, there is a mass, then the Nautical procession, with decorated canoes and other boats, with the patron image of San Antonio.

There is an annual Expo San Antonio to show artisan work of the inhabitants and the products of the different companies. This exposition gives students a space to show different products and works made in their schools, in all different areas such as sciences, chemistry, and workshops such as mechanics, electricity, carpentry and iron metal work.

== Bibliography ==
- Departamento de Cultura de la Municipalidad de San Antonio.
