= Hilário Maximiniano Antunes Gurjão =

Brazilian general (1820–1869)

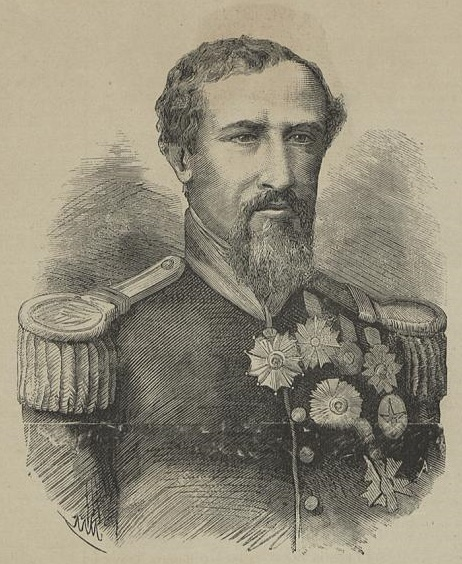
- General Gurjão
- Born: 21 February 1820; Belém, Pará, Brazil, Portugal
- Died: 17 January 1869 (aged 48) Paraguay
- Allegiance: Empire of Brazil
- Branch: Imperial Brazilian Army
- Service years: 1834–1869
- Rank: Brigadier general
- Conflicts: Cabanagem; Paraguayan War; Humaitá campaign; Battle of Itapirú; Battle of Tuyutí; Pikysyry campaign; Battle of Ytororó (DOW)
- Awards: Herói, Cavalheiro da Ordem de Christo http://memoria.bn.gov.br/DocReader/700002/2046

Hilário Maximiniano Antunes Gurjão (21 February 1820 – 17 January 1869) was a Brazilian military officer who is considered a hero of the Paraguayan War. He is known as the first general born in the state of Pará and participated in the battles of Tuyutí and Ytororó, dying of wounds in the latter battle.

== Origin ==
Hilário was born on 21 February 1820 in Belém, as the son of Major Hilário Pedro Gurjão and Dorothéa de Andrade Gurjão. His paternal grandfather was General Francisco Pedro de Mendonça Gorjão, who was the 18th Governor of the State of Grão-Pará.

== Cabanagem and Education ==
At the age of 14, he already accompanied his father alongside the loyalists, participating in the Cabanagem in 1834. At the age of 16, he was aboard the schooner Bela Maria during the blockade made on 13 May 1836, against the cabanos commanded by Eduardo Angelim, who fled to the municipality of Acará and was promoted to 1st Lieutenant in the same year. On 28 February 1839, he was assigned to command the troops based in the fortress of São José in Macapá. On 2 December of that same year, he was promoted to 2nd Lieutenant. He returned to Belém, where he attended the School of Artillery and in 1841, was promoted to Captain at just 21 years old. Traveling to Rio de Janeiro, he enrolled in the Military College of Rio de Janeiro, graduating with a BA in Mathematics and specializing in artillery courses.

== Paraguayan War ==
He held various military posts in Pará and Amazonas with the mission of fortifying the Amazon. In 1857, he was promoted to Lieutenant Colonel, when he inspected the fortresses of Macapá, Gurupá and Óbidos. Returning to Rio de Janeiro, he took command of the 3rd Artillery Battalion, where he received the decoration of Knight of the Order of Christ and the Order of Aviz and given command of the 1st Infantry Battalion. In 1865, he distinguished himself in the Paraguayan War with the rank of Colonel as he went to participate in the Battle of Itapirú and the Battle of Tuyutí, commanding the 17th Artillery Brigade during the latter.

He then commanded the Corrientes garrison and the Chaco forces in combined action with the squadron on 3 September 1867, and evicted the Paraguayans from Sauce on March 21, 1868, forcing them to abandon the entire line of nearby fortifications, including the fortress of Curu, and concentrate on Humaitá. For this action, he was promoted to Brigadier General in the same year. Heading towards the Gran Chaco, he managed to establish communication between the squadron anchored below Angustura and the one in front of Vileta. In November, he was designated by the Duke of Caxias to command the artillery of the 2nd Army Corps under the command of Marshal Argolo Ferrão and thanks to the actions of Hilário Gurjão, on December 5 the 2nd Corps landed in Santo Antonio.

During the Battle of Itororó, the Duke of Caxias determined that the bridge over the Itororó stream be defended at all costs. The Brazilian forces were outnumbered and most of their commanders were unable to serve or were killed. After several unsuccessful attempts, a new order came to take the bridge under intense Paraguayan fire. General Gurjão, verifying the hesitation of the troops, took the lead and shouted “See how a Brazilian general dies!”. The soldiers motivated by the brave Generals advance, managed to conquer the bridge but during the charge, Gurjão was mortally wounded and chose to not resist the wounds, dying from them on 17 January 1869.

== Legacy ==
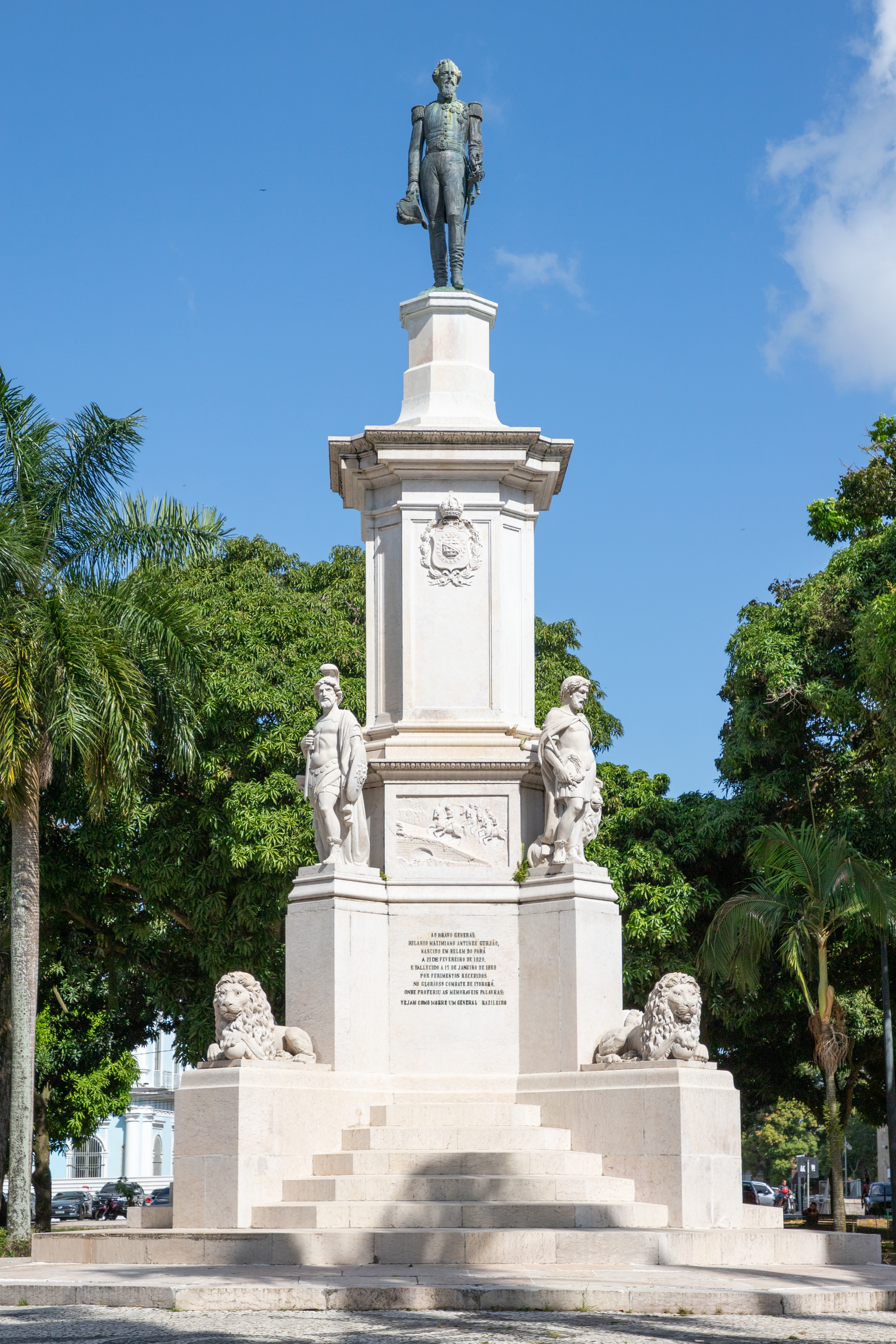
Monument to General Gurjão, 1882, created by Germano José de Salles (1827-1902). It is located at Praça Dom Pedro II in Belém, Pará

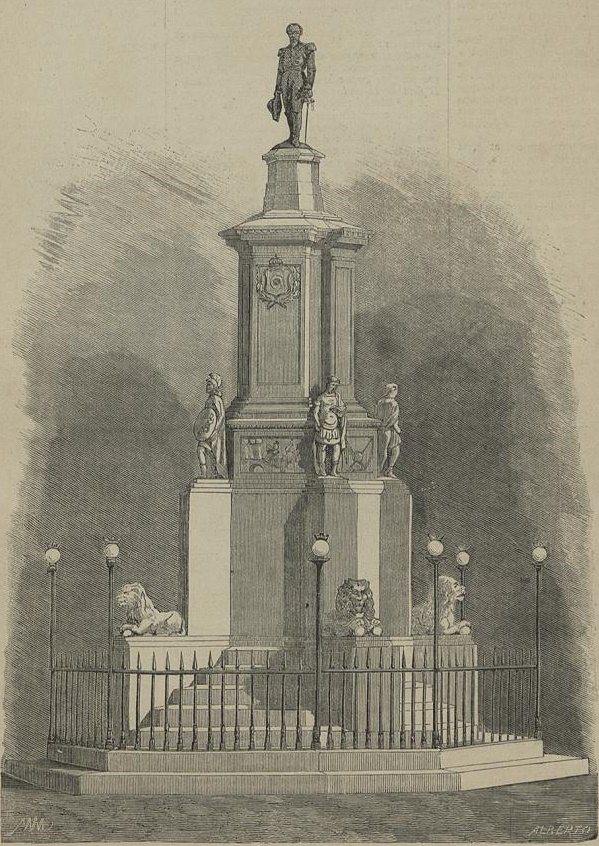
Illustration of the Monument to General Gurjão shortly after its inauguration

His remains were taken to the Court, taken from the Igreja da Cruz dos Militares to the Navy Arsenal, where they were shipped to his home province of Pará on the afternoon of 30 June 1870. The urn was taken by the Count of Eu, the Minister of War Marquis of Muritiba and by several Generals. Emperor Dom Pedro II of Brazil accompanied the procession on foot to the navy arsenal.

On 2 September 1870, under Law No. 615 authorized the government to erect the monument to General Hilário Maximiano Antunes Gurjão, located in the commercial center of Belém. For a decade the project remained without execution. A new legislative resolution taken on 4 April 1880, transformed into Law No. 982 which confirmed the previous law.

The monument had first been thought of as a mausoleum in the Soledade Cemetery but it was then decided to erect a monument in honor of General Gurjão at Praça das Mercês. But they saw that the site would not be suitable because of the height of the neighboring buildings and the monument would be disproportionate. So it was decided that it would be in Dom Pedro II Square, which had previously been called the Primitive Palace Square, Constitution Square, the Square of Independence and the Affonso Penna Park. On 15 August 1882, the commemorative date of the Adhesion of Pará, the monument was inaugurated under the governorship of the Baron of Marajó.

During the 77th anniversary of the Battle of Monte Castello and the birthday of General Gurjão, the Northern Military Command celebrated the anniversaries and visited the monument.
