= Fernando Machado (colonel) =

Brazilian military officer (1822–1868)

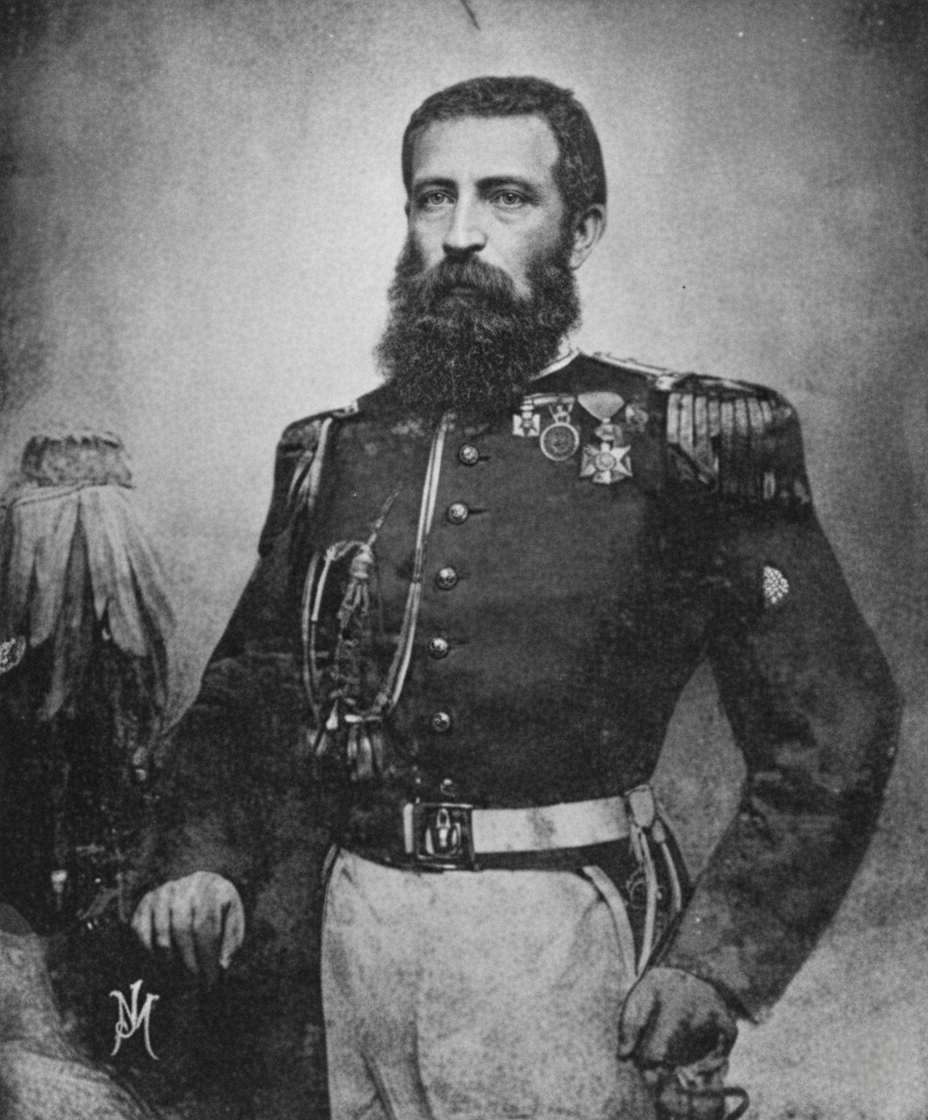
- Born: 11 January 1822; Desterro, Santa Catarina, Brazil
- Died: 6 December 1868 (aged 46); Ypané, Central, Paraguay
- Military career
- Allegiance: Brazil
- Branch: Imperial Brazilian Army
- Service years: 1837–1868
- Rank: Colonel
- Conflicts: Ragamuffin War; Liberal rebellions of 1842; Paraguayan War; Humaitá campaign; Battle of Paso de Patria; Battle of Tuyutí; Battle of Potreiro Pires; Battle of Linha Sauce; Battle of Curupayty; Passage of Humaitá; Pikysyry campaign; Battle of Ytororó (DOW)

Fernando Machado de Sousa (11 January 1822 – 6 December 1868) was a Brazilian colonel of the Paraguayan War. He was the commander of the 7th Brigade of the 3rd Division during the war but was fatally wounded during the Battle of Ytororó.

== Military career ==
Fernando was born as the son of Manuel Machado de Sousa and Josefa Bernardina Borges and would later marry Angélica Rosa Magalhães Fontoura. During his childhood, he lived along the coast at Armação de Itapocoroi and during his college years, he would study at a Jesuit school. He then joined the Imperial Brazilian Army on 9 November 1838, as a 1st cadet in the Provisional Corps of Desterro. He gained first promotion to Second Sergeant on 1 February 1839. He participated in the Ragamuffin War in Laguna and Rio Grande do Sul. During the War, he was stationed for the defense of São José do Norte against the forces of Bento Gonçalves da Silva. For his service, he was promoted to Lieutenant and stationed at the Batalhão da Serra. He then briefly went north to suppress the Liberal rebellions of 1842 within the provinces of Minas Gerais and São Paulo.

Machado de Sousa then returned south to participate in the Battle of Ponche Verde and the Battle of Porongos and served within the garrison of Alegrete under Colonel Arruda. He was then promoted to Captain on 2 December 1847, but was then transferred to Rio de Janeiro but from there, he was transferred to Minas Gerais where he stayed until November 1849. Before the Paraguayan War broke out, he was stationed in Paraná, Bahia, Pernambuco. Alagoas and Rio Grande do Sul as a subordinate of Luís Alves de Lima e Silva, Duke of Caxias.

By the time the Paraguayan War broke out, he was commanding a battalion with a malarial fever so he had to undergo treatment. When his health returned to an active state, he was given command of the 11th Infantry Brigade of the 2nd Army Corps and participated in the Battle of Curuzú. He would then fight at the battles of Paso de Patria, Tuyutí where he would get wounded, Potreiro Pires, Linha Sauce, Curupayty and the Passage of Humaitá. His final engagement would be at the Battle of Ytororó where he was mortally wounded while attempting to capture the bridge over the Ytororó on 6 December 1868.

== Legacy ==
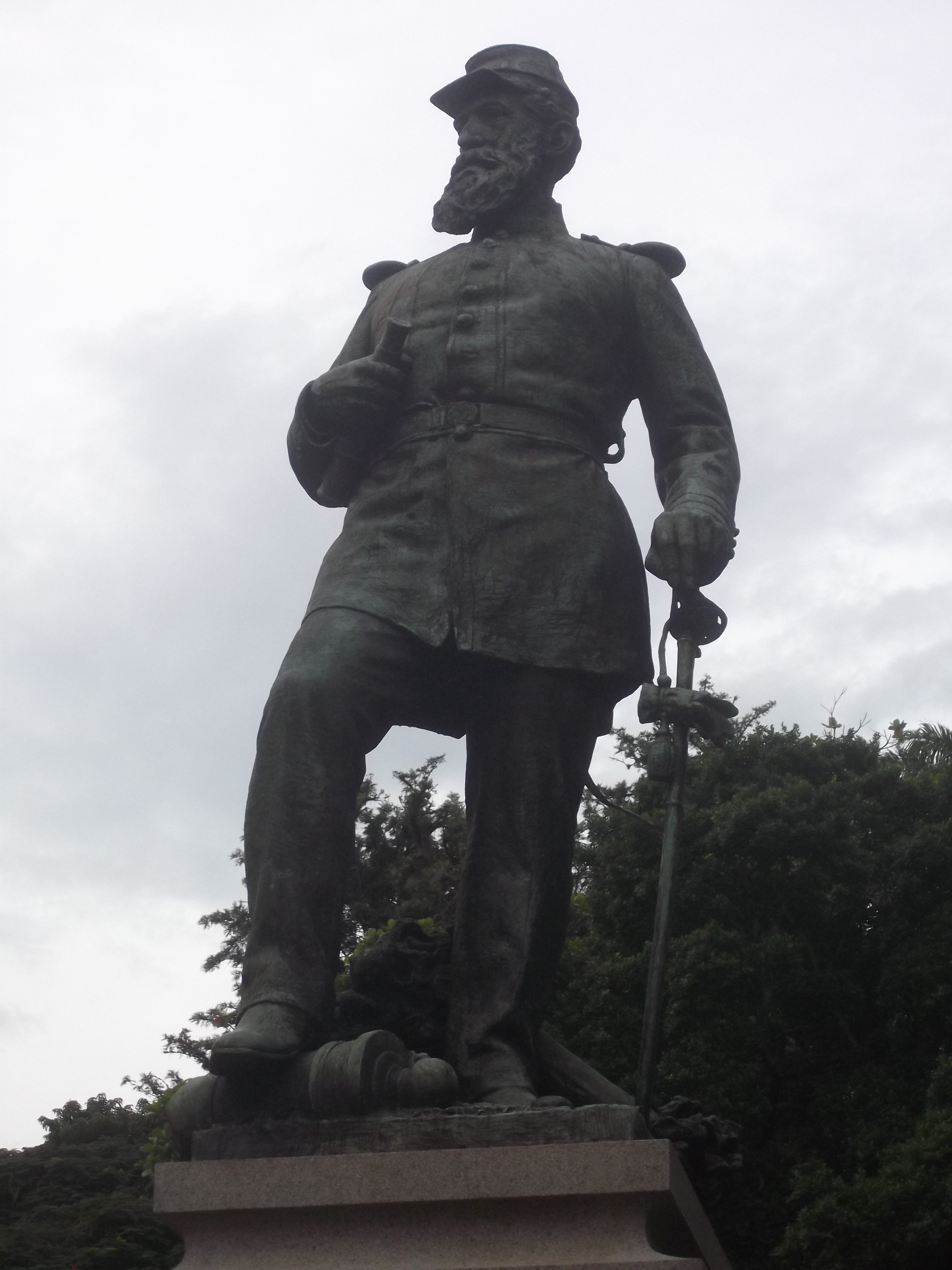
Statue of the monument to Fernando Machado in Florianópolis

The street where he was born today bears his name as well as a square in Florianópolis which was inaugurated in 1917. In Porto Alegre he was also honored, in 1870, with the name of a street, formerly called Rua do Arvoredo. The 63rd Infantry Battalion of the Army, headquartered in Florianópolis, is named after him. One of the main avenues in the city of Chapecó, in Santa Catarina, was named after Fernando Machado. The letters he wrote to his wife during the war were published in the Revista do Instituto Histórico e Geográfica de Santa Catarina in 1913 and 1914.
