= Salustiano Jerônimo dos Reis, Baron of Camaquã =

Brazilian Marshal (1822–1893)

Salustiano Jerônimo dos Reis
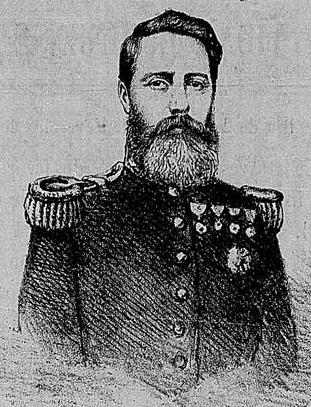
- Born: January 25, 1822; Cisplatina, Brazil
- Died: July 4, 1893 (aged 71); Porto Alegre, Rio Grande do Sul, Brazil
- Burial place: Santa Casa de Misericórdia, Porto Alegre, Rio Grande do Sul, Brazil
- Spouse: Plácida Elvira Teixeira Fernandes (m. 1844)
- Military career
- Allegiance: Empire of Brazil; First Brazilian Republic
- Branch: Imperial Brazilian Army; Brazilian Army
- Service years: 1837 – 1893
- Rank: Marshal
- Conflicts: Ragamuffin War; Platine War; Paraguayan War; Humaitá campaign; Battle of Tuyutí; Pikysyry campaign; Battle of Ytororó

Salustiano Jerônimo dos Reis, Baron of Camaquã was a 19th-century Brazilian Marshal. He participated in several wars, notably in his participation in the Paraguayan War as he played a major role during the Battle of Ytororó.

== Biography ==
Salustiano was born on January 25, 1822, at Cisplatina as the son of Portuguese Brigadier General Salustiano Severino dos Reis and Isabel Tomásia Thompson. He married Plácida Elvira Teixeira Fernandes at Caçapava in 1844.

He began his military career in 1837, participating in the Ragamuffin War and the Platine War. During the Paraguayan War, he played an important role in the Battle of Itororó. During the Battle of Tuyuti he lost his son, Salustio, who was his aide-de-camp as he commanded the 14th Brigade of the 6th Division during the battle. When he arrived back to Porto Alegre, the Chamber of Deputies of the city dedicated to name a street after him as homage for his services on March 28, 1876. He ended his military career as a marshal.

He was commander of the arms of Rio Grande do Sul several times and was also commander of the 6th Military District. He was also a commander of the Order of Aviz, the Order of Christ, the Order of the Rose and the Officer of the Order of the Cruzeiro.
