= George Thompson (engineer) =

British engineer active in Paraguay

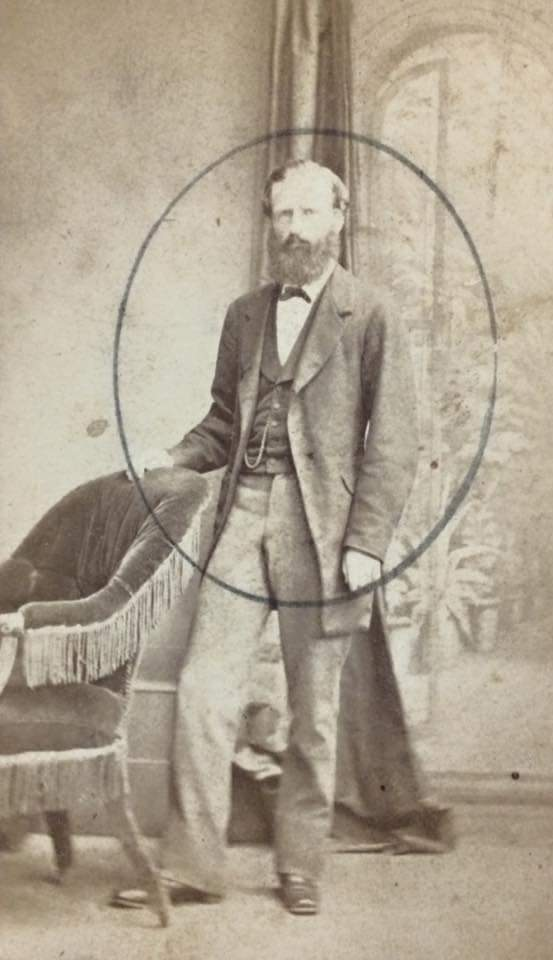
- Born: 26 March 1839; Greenwich, Kent, England
- Died: March 1876 (aged 36–37) Asunción, Paraguay
- Allegiance: Paraguay
- Branch: Paraguayan Army
- Rank: Lieutenant-colonel
- Conflicts: Paraguayan War
- Children: 3

George Thompson (26 March 1839 – March 1876) was an English engineer and military officer who was in charge of the Paraguayan military engineering during the Paraguayan War. He later wrote a history of this conflict that became one of the main sources on the subject.

== Early life ==
Thompson was born in Greenwich on 26 March 1839. In 1849 he was sent to a school near Stuttgart, which he left in 1852, continuing his studies near London until 1854. From 1855 to 1857 he served an apprenticeship at the government works in Malta, and was put on the engineering staff of the gasworks in that island. He returned to England in 1857 and soon afterwards was engaged for one year as a draughtsman at a locomotive works. That was the total sum of his engineering experience when he left for South America in 1858, aged 19.

== Paraguay ==
In the middle of the nineteenth century the government of Carlos Antonio López, determined to open up Paraguay to modern technology, hired for that purpose a considerable number of technicians, mainly British.

In September 1858 Thompson joined the staff of the Asunción–Villarica railway in Paraguay, working under the British engineers George Paddison, Burrell and Valpy. Although a young man, he was soon considered to be one of the best Guaraní scholars amongst the English, besides speaking fluently five or six other languages.

== The Paraguayan War ==
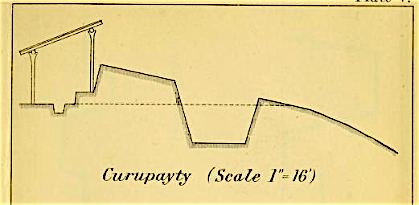
Profile of the trench at Curupayty, designed by Thompson. (Sketch by George Thompson.)

After the war between Paraguay and the allied forces of Brazil and the Argentine and Uruguayan Republics broke out, Thompson offered his services as a military engineer to the Paraguayan President, Francisco Solano López, in 1865. The offer was accepted and he joined the army in June of that year, taking a prominent role in the war until the end of 1868.

At the war's outbreak Thompson was a railway engineer and had no military experience at all. Furthermore, throughout the war, Paraguay's nominal chief military engineer, Hungarian colonel Wisner de Morgenstern (who had designed the Fortress of Humaitá) was seriously ill, and so the work fell on Thompson's shoulders. Thus an untried 26-year-old man became the de facto chief military engineer of the Paraguayan army:

I had no pretensions to a knowledge of military engineering or artillery beyond what I could pick up from some books which I was able to obtain in Paraguay, and which I studied for the occasion. The principal of these were Macaulay's "Field Fortification" and "The Professional Papers of the Corps of Royal Engineers" and various works on artillery.

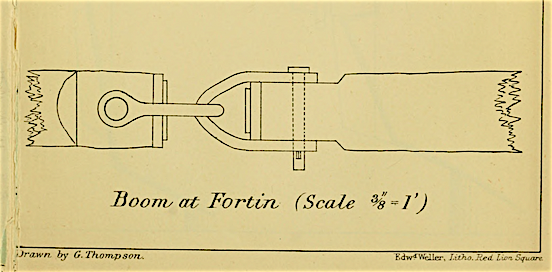
The simple and effective chain boom at Fortín designed by Thompson. Made of timbó logs joined end-to-end by iron shackles, it floated underwater so it could not be sunk by naval gunfire.

Improvising, he used the material and human resources of the country and made earthworks, fortifications and artillery emplacements. His most notable works were the fortifications of Angostura and the trenches – constructed, surreptitiously, overnight, in daring proximity to the Allies' positions – of the Boquerón del Sauce and Curupaity; Angostura held the allied fleet at bay for several weeks, and the Curupaity trenches led to the Allies' worst defeat of the war.

Thompson was promoted to the rank of lieutenant-colonel in the Paraguayan army and received from President López the decoration of Caballero del órden del mérito (Knight of the Order of Merit). Although forced to capitulate at Angostura, the allies allowed him the honours of war, as he refused to surrender at discretion.

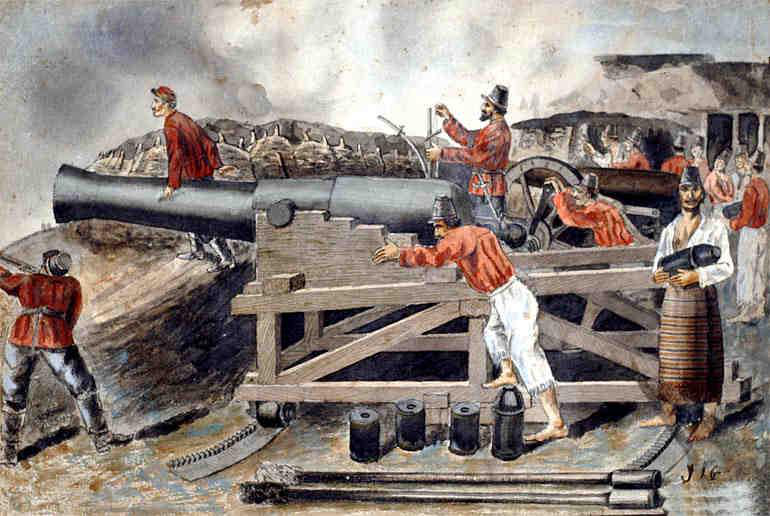
Angostura battery: The two officers, one calculating the elevation and the other watching, are the commander Lucas Carrillo and George Thompson. By the Argentine general and watercolourist José Ignacio Garmendía (1841-1925).

== After the war ==
Thompson spent a few months in England in 1869, during which he wrote The War in Paraguay: With a Historical Sketch of the Country and Its People and Notes Upon the Military Engineering of the War. Since Thompson had been the foreigner with best access to President López – from whom he took his orders in Guaraní – and privy to many military matters, the book is an important source on the history of the war, one of the earliest of its kind and widely used by later historians. A translation into Spanish was published in Buenos Aires 1910.

Thompson then returned to South America and married a Paraguayan woman by whom he had three children. After some topographical work in Córdoba, Argentina, he returned to Paraguay in 1870 and became the engineer and manager of the Asunción–Villarica railway. He died in Asunción in March 1876, aged 37.
