= Battle of Ytororó =

Battle on the Paraguay War

- Part of the Pikysyry campaign
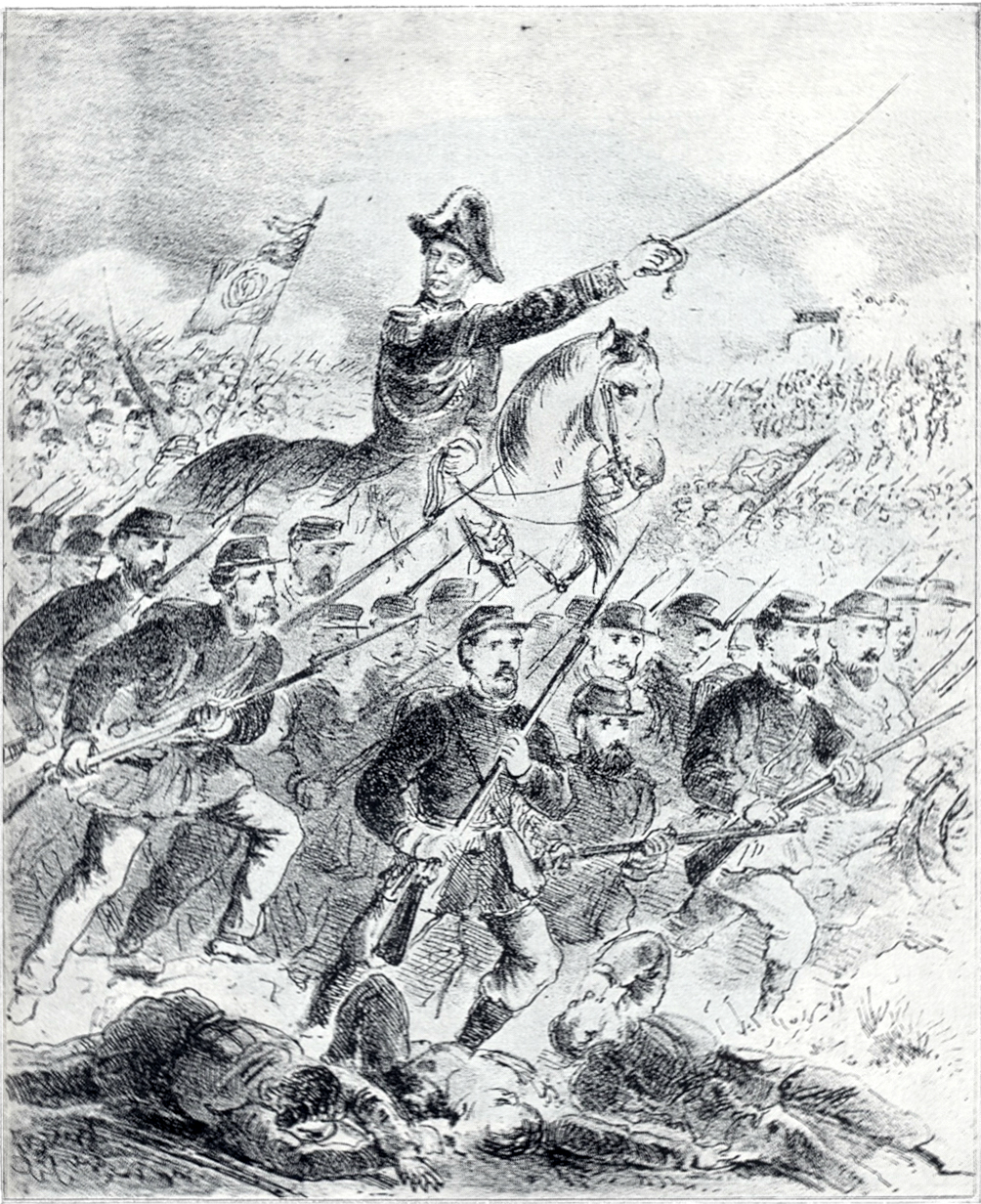
- Caxias leading the Brazilian Army
Date	December 6, 1868
Location	Paraguay
Result	Brazilian victory

Belligerents
Empire of Brazil	Paraguay

Commanders and leaders
Marquess of Caxias	Bernardino Caballero

Strength
18,667 soldiers	5,000 soldiers

Casualties and losses
1,862: 285 dead 1,577 wounded	1,446: 330 dead 1,116 wounded

On the morning of 6 December 1868, marshal of the Imperial Brazilian Army, Luís Alves de Lima e Silva, Marquis (later Duke) of Caxias, moved with 16,999 infantrymen, 926 cavalrymen and 742 artillerymen, to take Villeta, a Paraguayan city, as a plan to make further attacks on the Paraguayan Army rear. Nevertheless, Paraguayan president and commander-in-chief of the army Francisco Solano López was aware of the landing the Allies had made in the rear of his army.

Taking advantage of the Allies' slow march, he sent colonel Bernardino Caballero with 5,000 men and 12 guns, to stop the enemy at a narrow passage over a stream called Ytororó. Caballero deployed his troops so that Caxias would have to cross the only passage at disposal (a bridge) under heavy fire.

The battle started by late morning and was characterized by attacks and counterattacks for control of the bridge. By nightfall, after a fierce fight, the bridge was taken by Brazilian volunteer battalions led personally by marshal Caxias shouting "Follow me, those of you who are Brazilians", and the Allies could advance towards Villeta.

== The battle ==
The Imperial Brazilian Army received a new order: the 48th Fatherland Volunteers Corps, under the command of major Secundino Filafiano de Melo Tamborim, passed from the 9th Infantry Brigade to the 5th Infantry Brigade of Colonel Fernando Machado de Sousa. From then on, this detachment had the 1st Infantry Battalion and 13th Infantry Battalions and the 34th Volunteer Corps and 48th Volunteer Corps.

Fernando Machado's brigade, together with Colonel Domingos Rodrigues Seixas's 2nd Infantry Brigade, formed the 2nd Infantry Division, led by Colonel Salustiano Jerônimo dos Reis, a unit which itself pertained to the 2nd Army Corps of Marshal Alexandre Gomes de Argolo Ferrão Filho, responsible for ensuring security when the army disembarked at Guarda de Santo Antonio, more precisely in the rut of the left margin.

On 4 December 1868, the Infantry and Artillery that were camped in the Chaco region embarked. The cavalry, under the command of Brigadier José Luís Mena Barreto, marched by land to the border town of Santa Helena, located in the province of Paraná, chosen point for landing on the left bank of the river.

The Paraguayan troops were commanded by General Bernardino Caballero, with a force of five to 6,000 men, divided into 16 infantry battalions, 6 cavalry regiments, and 12 guns. In command of the infantry was lieutenant colonel Germán Serrano, the cavalry was divided into two wings under the command of colonel Valois Rivarola and Major Juan Lanson. At the top of the hill, just beyond the bridge over the creek was the artillery, commanded by Major Moreno. The struggle depended more on dexterity of their men than the number enemy soldiers. Specifically, a cannon had been placed next to the bridge to eliminate any enemy troops who reached the side they occupied of the river.

According to José Bernardino Bormann, on the 5th of December Caxias arrived to inspect the camp, the troops and their willingness to fight. General Argolo Ferrão told him that it was not possible to attack the enemy position due to the lack of sufficient cavalry and even mules to help pull the artillery.

Despite this, Caxias decided to move forward and occupy the desired position by sending the cavalry squadrons of João Niederauer Sobrinho and two infantry battalions, promising to reinforce them with more infantry and artillery when they got enough animals to carry a greater load. The path leading to the edge of the stream was tortuous, with a dense vegetation that hindered the movement of the units, and, when Niederauer arrived, the Paraguayans were already entrenched on the other side of the river.

By nightfall, Niederauer warned General Argolo about the enemy positioning and awaited further orders from Caxias. It was already dark and with the rugged and little known terrain, Caxias ordered Niederauer to pull back, but also to tell Argolo about the positions in which the advance forces should remain until dawn. During the wait, it is reported that the troops had a festive air, the soldiers were at ease, dancing and singing around campfires.

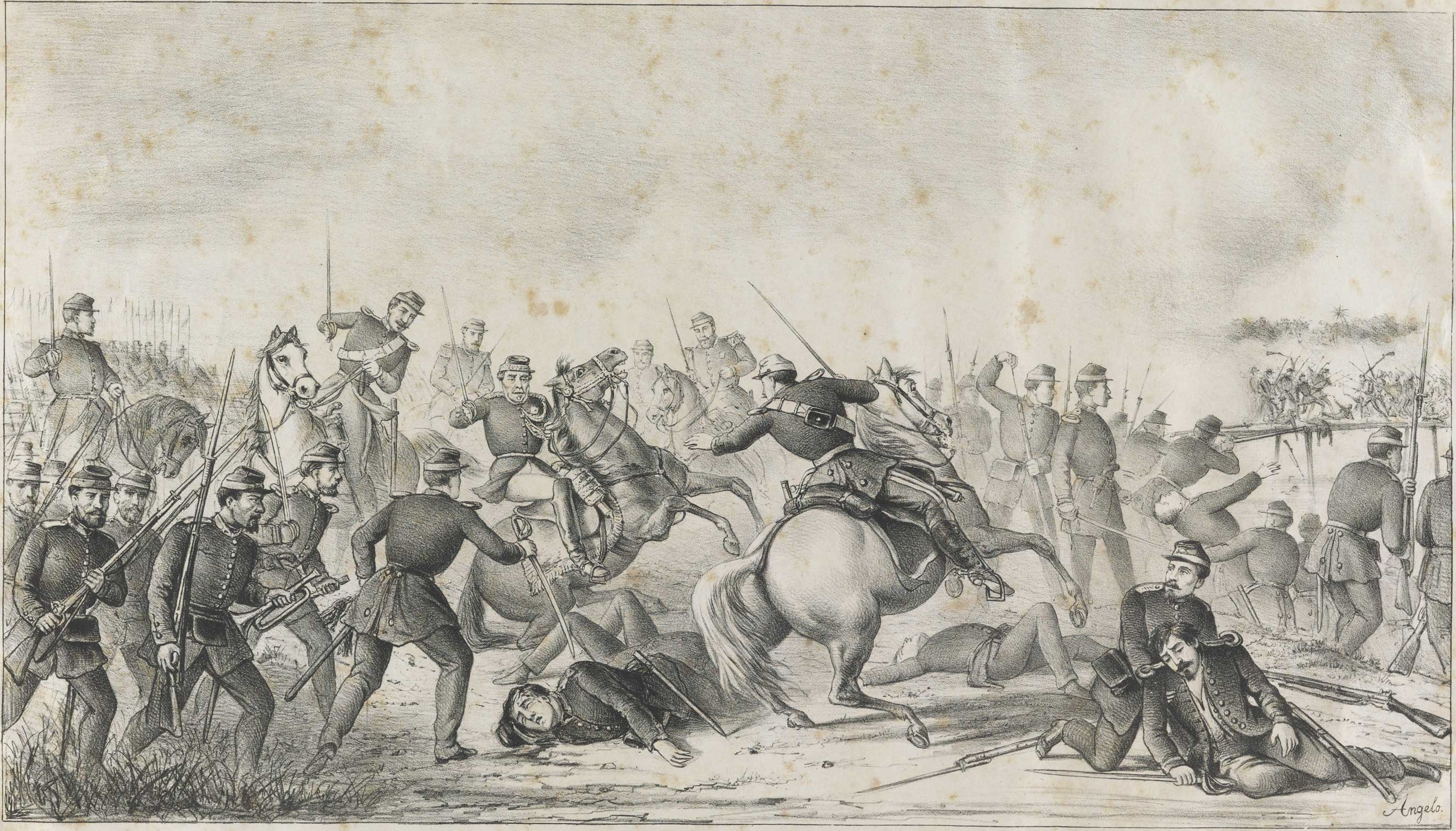
Episode of the passage and capture of the bridge over the Ytororó stream, on December 6th, 1868

To get to the bridge over the Itororó, Brazilian troops would travel more than two miles, through the city of San Antonio and a difficult road for the cavalry and artillery. For the safety of the group, Colonel Fernando Machado's brigade served as rear guard for the 2nd Army Corps. The latter ensured the protection of the first group, Niederauer Sobrinho's cavalry squadron.

When the task force came together to the bridge the troops commanded by Colonel Serrano were already in place, waiting for the clash with the Brazilians. By order of General Argolo, the Brazilian Imperial Army began to attack. The Colonel ordered, besides, that the cavalry brigades and cannons were to face the bridge.

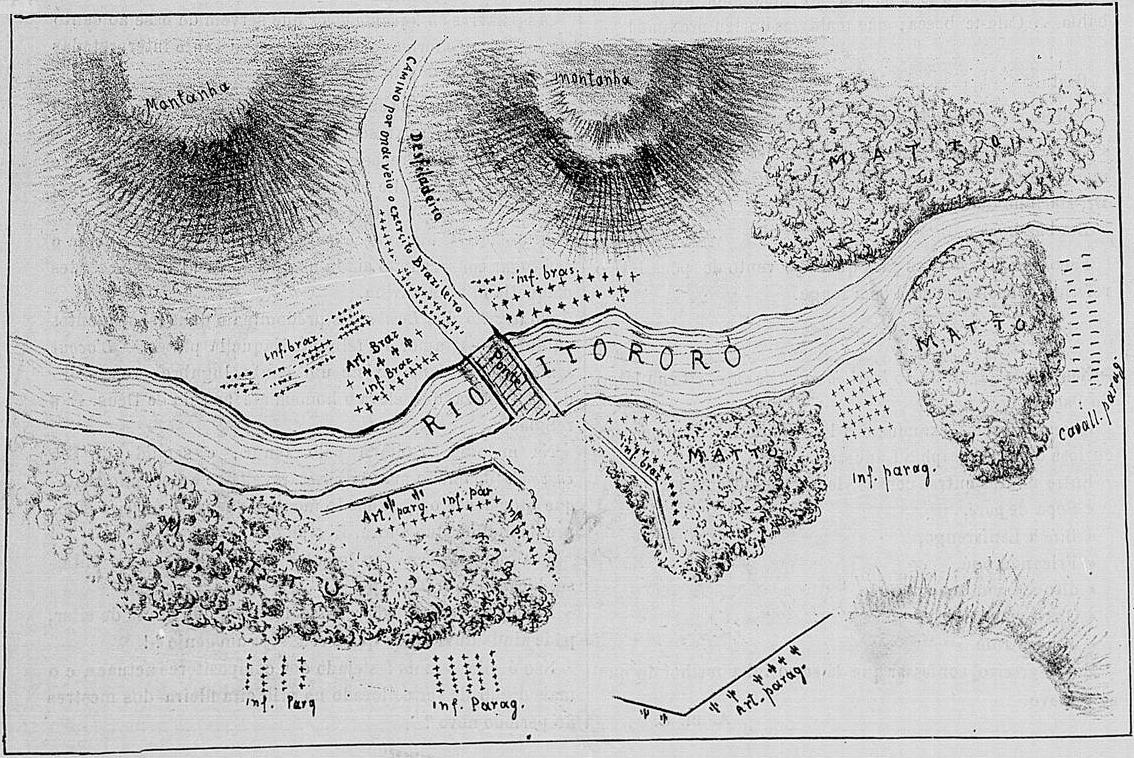
A hand-painted map of the battle of Ytororó

The first encounter was with Lieutenant Colonel João Antônio de Oliveira Valporto, which progressed with five companies of the 1st Line Battalion toward the Paraguayan artillery. The enemy firepower was excessive, and, accordingly, Valporto's troops retreated in confusion to the other side.

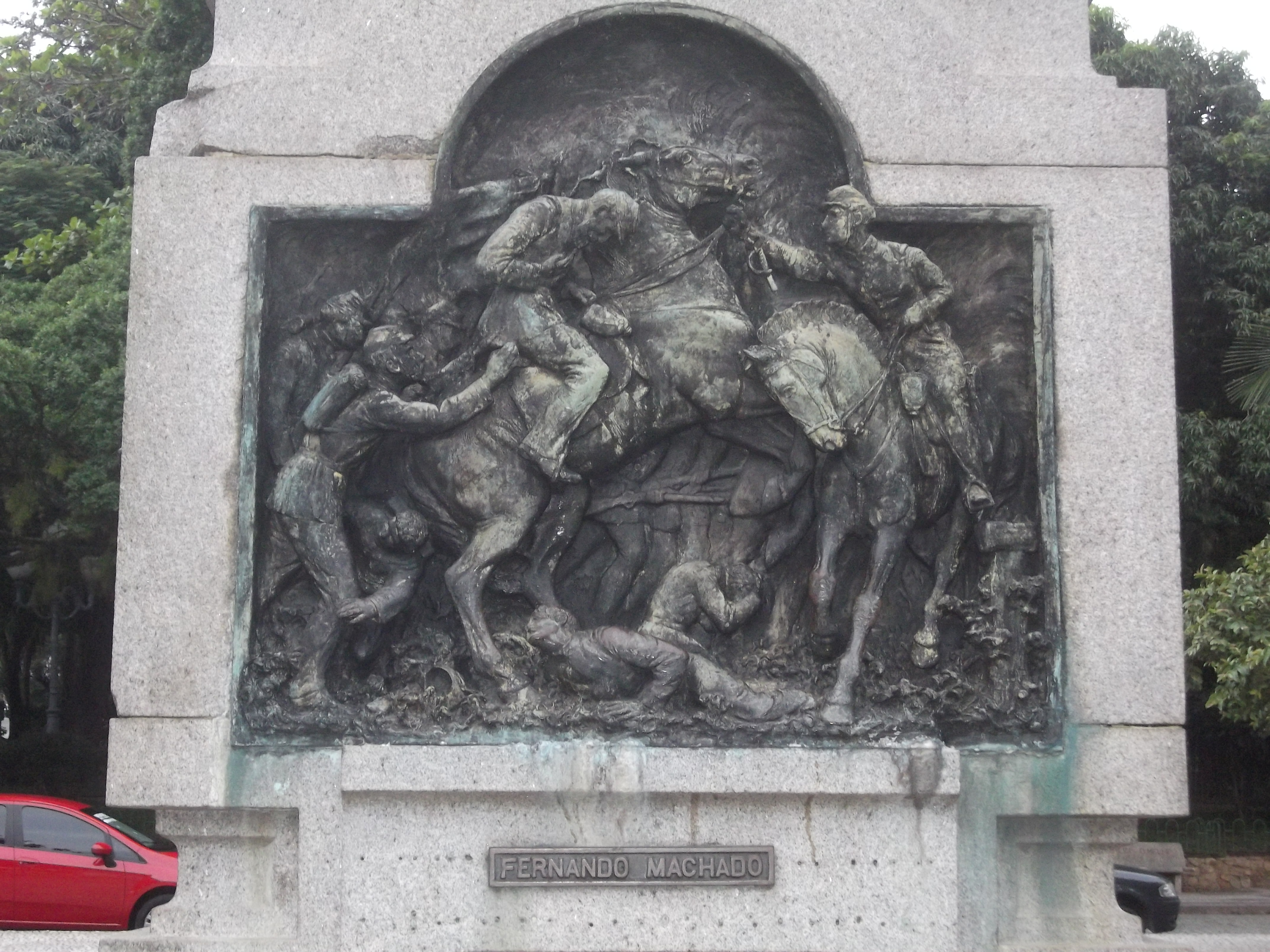
Death of Colonel Fernando Machado

Noticing that the battalion retreated, Colonel Fernando Machado advanced on the bridge with the 34th and 48th Fatherland Volunteers' Corps, thrusting against the enemy, leaving the 13th Line Corps as protection for the allied artillery. However, his attack was also a failure, because the enemy artillery opened heavy fire on his group, fatally wounding him.

João Niederauer Sobrinho then crossed the bridge with the 6th Lancers and additional battalions, and stormed the Paraguayan positions, forcing them to retreat hastily. With this, Niederauer was able to take four enemy guns, part of those which had been previously responsible for disrupting the allied advance.

The Brazilian Imperial army was losing strength, with casualties mounting as the conflict wore on. The delay in the arrival during the battle of General Osório's troops, as had previously been ordered by the Marshal Duke of Caxias, led the latter to, at 65 years of age, march toward the enemy, cheering and calling the Brazilian troops for what seemed to be the "all or nothing" this first episode of the end of the War of the Triple Alliance. Tired soldiers, touched by the bravery of his marshal, followed him for a showdown with redoubled spirit and took the enemy position permanently.

== See also ==
- Ytororó order of battle

== Sources ==
- http://www.geocities.com/Pentagon/Camp/2523
