= Elizardo Aquino =

Paraguayan general (1825–1866)

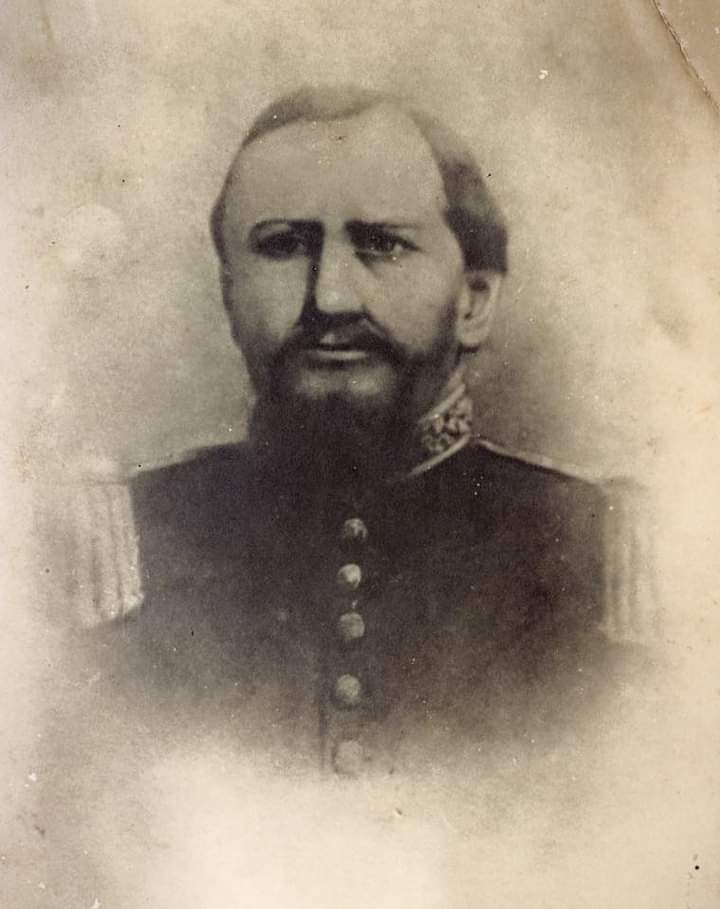
- Born: 1825; Luque, Central Department, Paraguay
- Died: 19 July 1866 (aged 41); Paso Pucú, Ñeembucú, Paraguay
- Military career
- Allegiance: Paraguay
- Branch: Paraguayan Army
- Service years: 1847 — 1866
- Rank: General de brigada
- Nickname: Tigre de la Vanguardia
- Conflicts: Paraguayan War; Corrientes campaign; Battle of the Riachuelo; Battle of Paso de Mercedes; Battle of Paso de Cuevas; Humaitá campaign; Passage of Humaitá; Battle of Boquerón †

José Elizardo Aquino Jara (1825 – 19 July 1866) was a Paraguayan general who was considered a hero of the War of the Triple Alliance. He was one of the first senior Paraguayan military leaders to die in combat. Aquino was a lieutenant colonel at the time of being shot during the Battle of Boquerón.

== Early years ==
José Elizardo Aquino was born in Zárate Isla, Luque in 1825. He was the fifth of eleven siblings of the marriage of the Spanish Patricio Aquino and the Paraguayan Rosa Isabel Jara. One of his sisters was named V Vicente.

== Military career ==
In 1847 Aquino joined the Paraguayan Army as a member of Battalion No. 2 of Asunción. He was transferred to the Paso de Patria camp that was recently installed. Due to his handicraft conditions, he was put at a very young age in charge of the Ybycuí iron foundry, where cannons and ammunition were manufactured for the army. Later he worked in the Shipyards of the Ribera, where he developed tasks as a naval carpenter. He collaborated (with his famous "chaflaneros") in the construction of the first Paraguayan railway, between Areguá and Paraguarí.

When the Paraguayan War began, Aquino (39 years old) was promoted to captain. He created the Corps of Sappers and worked on the fortification of Humaitá, where the Passage of Humaitá would take place. He embarked north under the command of General Barrios. In the Mato Grosso campaign, he had a relevant performance that earned him special mentions from Marshal López. In 1865 he distinguished himself in the operations of the South commanded by General Bruguez.

Aquino heroically participated in the Battles of Riachuelo, Mercedes and Paso de Cuevas. His fearlessness earned him the nickname Tigre de la Vanguardia, and earned him the National Order of Merit and promotion to lieutenant colonel.

For his participation in the Battle of Estero Bellaco on May 2, 1866, he was promoted to the rank of colonel. Before the Battle of Boquerón, under the orders of General José E. Díaz and Major Jorge Thompson, he organized the trenches in the fields of Boquerón and Sauce.

In a memorable action on July 16, 1866, Aquino personally led the 6th, 7th and 8th battalions on a counterattack to regain lost positions. In one of the advances, when the Imperial Brazilian Army was retreating in complete disorder, Aquino threw himself mounted on an overo through the middle of the enemy soldiers.

During combat, this colonel would shout to excite the troops and say that he wanted to kill some "blacks" with his bare hands. After saying that, Aquino dug his spurs into his horse and, with a joyful air and a smile on his lips, he threw himself on the retreating Brazilians, killing a "dark African" soldier he encountered on his way.

— Francisco Doratioto

Aquino was shot on the stomach by a rifle bullet from another of the fleeing Brazilian soldiers. His assistants picked him up and took him to the Paso Pucú headquarters. There, Solano López promoted him to brigadier general on his deathbed. He died at age 42, three days later and his remains were buried near that barracks.

One hundred and two years later, on November 27, 1968, the Luque municipal council, appointed by the dictator Alfredo Stroessner, had Aquino's remains transferred from the Paso Pucú military cemetery to Luque to be deposited in the mausoleum built in his honor in Elizardo Aquino square in the city of Luque. The architectural project of the mausoleum was carried out by the Luqueño architecture student César Vera, with the sponsorship of Dr. Reinerio Martínez Duarte.

=== Legacy ===
The Nueva Trinacria colony, a village populated by Italian immigrants, which is located 278 km northeast of Asunción, was renamed General Elizardo Aquino. Route 3 is also named after Aquino.

=== Family ===
In the history of this war, there was an Ensign with the surname of Aquino but it's unknown if he is one of Elizardo's brothers.

On August 27 [1869] the dictator's troops arrested three spies, two men and a woman, allied spies of Paraguayan nationality who had confessed that their contact was Ensign Aquino, of the presidential bodyguard, and that they had as a project assassinate Solano López. The ensign was arrested and brought before Solano López, who asked him about the plan to kill him. This fact would have been confirmed by Aquino. Then the following dialogue began:

"Yes, sir, he planned to kill him for various reasons: we lost our homeland and if we continued here it was only to accompany him." And in spite of that, Your Excellency becomes more tyrant every day. -Oh, is that so? But he was out of luck ...

"It is true, sir, Your Excellency took the best part." But there must be another one who has more luck and manages to kill him.

— Juan Crisóstomo Centurión: Memories: historical reminiscences about the war of the Paraguay

Solano López then called the commander of the presidential bodyguard, Colonel José Vicente Mongelós, another 16 officers and 86 lower-ranking military personnel. Although he acknowledged that Mongelós was innocent of having participated in the imaginary conspiracy, Solano López sentenced him to death and told him: «Mongelós, I know that you are personally innocent of the conspiracy, but you did not know anything about it either and that is why I'm going to have them shot: ignoring what happens in your own home is a very serious crime, and the regiment is one big family.

— Arturo Bray: Solano Lopez, a soldier of glory and misfortune

Mongelós and the vice commander of the presidential escort battalion, Major Riveros, were shot head on. The other defendants were shot in the back. On September 7, 1869, Solano López camped on the right bank of the Capivarí stream, and there he had some other soldiers of the presidential escort battalion who were involved in the conspiracy killed with spears.

— Francisco Doratioto: Maldita Guerra
