= Cándido López =

Argentine soldier and painter (1840-1902)

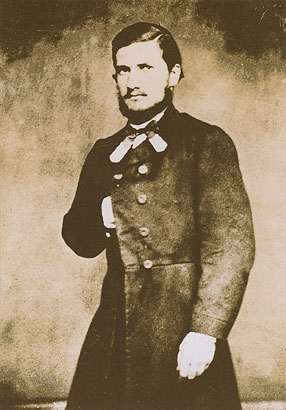
- López in uniform, mid 1860s
- Born: 29 August 1840; Buenos Aires, Argentina
- Died: 31 December 1902 (aged 62); Baradero, Argentina
- Known for: Painting
- Movement: Naïve

Cándido López (29 August 1840 – 31 December 1902) was an Argentine soldier and painter who worked in the Naïve style. He is best known for his historical scenes from the Paraguayan War in which he fought.

== Biography ==
=== Early life ===
He began his career as a daguerreotypist in 1858, having studied with Carlos Descalzi (1813–1879), a local portrait painter and photographer. This early process required precise planning for the composition of the image, so he began making sketches as an aid. Soon, this led him to take up painting as well.

Between 1859 and 1863, he often toured the small cities and villages of Buenos Aires Province and the south of Santa Fe Province, taking a large number of photographs. From 1860, he maintained a permanent studio in the suburb of Mercedes. Two years later, he would be commissioned to do a portrait of newly elected President Bartolomé Mitre. Later, he moved further into the country, to San Nicolás de los Arroyos.

In 1863, he became friends with the Italian muralist Ignacio Manzoni, who advised him to work on his use of color and perspective and introduced him to Baldassare Verazzi, another Italian painter living in Argentina, with whom he took lessons. He was planning to continue his studies in Europe when the Paraguayan War began, so he enlisted and was given the rank of Second Lieutenant because he could read and write. He was assigned to the battalion of the San Nicolás Infantry, in the Division of General Wenceslao Paunero.

=== The Paraguayan War ===
During his free time between battles, he painted landscapes and pictures of the military camps, which he sent to Buenos Aires. They proved to be very popular, as people were interested in everything related to the front. Later, he participated in the battles of Estero Bellaco and Boquerón. At the Battle of Curupayty, his right wrist was shattered by a grenade explosion and his arm had to amputated above the elbow to prevent the spread of gangrene. He was retired as an invalid and, after a convalescence in Corrientes, he returned to San Nicolás.

Once there, he began to practice painting with his left hand, but it was not until 1869 that he considered himself adept enough to continue his career. At that point, he devoted himself entirely to painting scenes of battles and military encampments. Later, at various times, he lived in San Antonio de Areco and Merlo.

He later married and lived in a house in Carmen de Areco, owned by his wife's family. From 1888 to 1902, López was busily involved in creating works based on sketches he had made during his tour of duty.

His final years were spent at a farm he was renting in Baradero. He was given a military burial with honors in La Recoleta Cemetery.

== Works ==
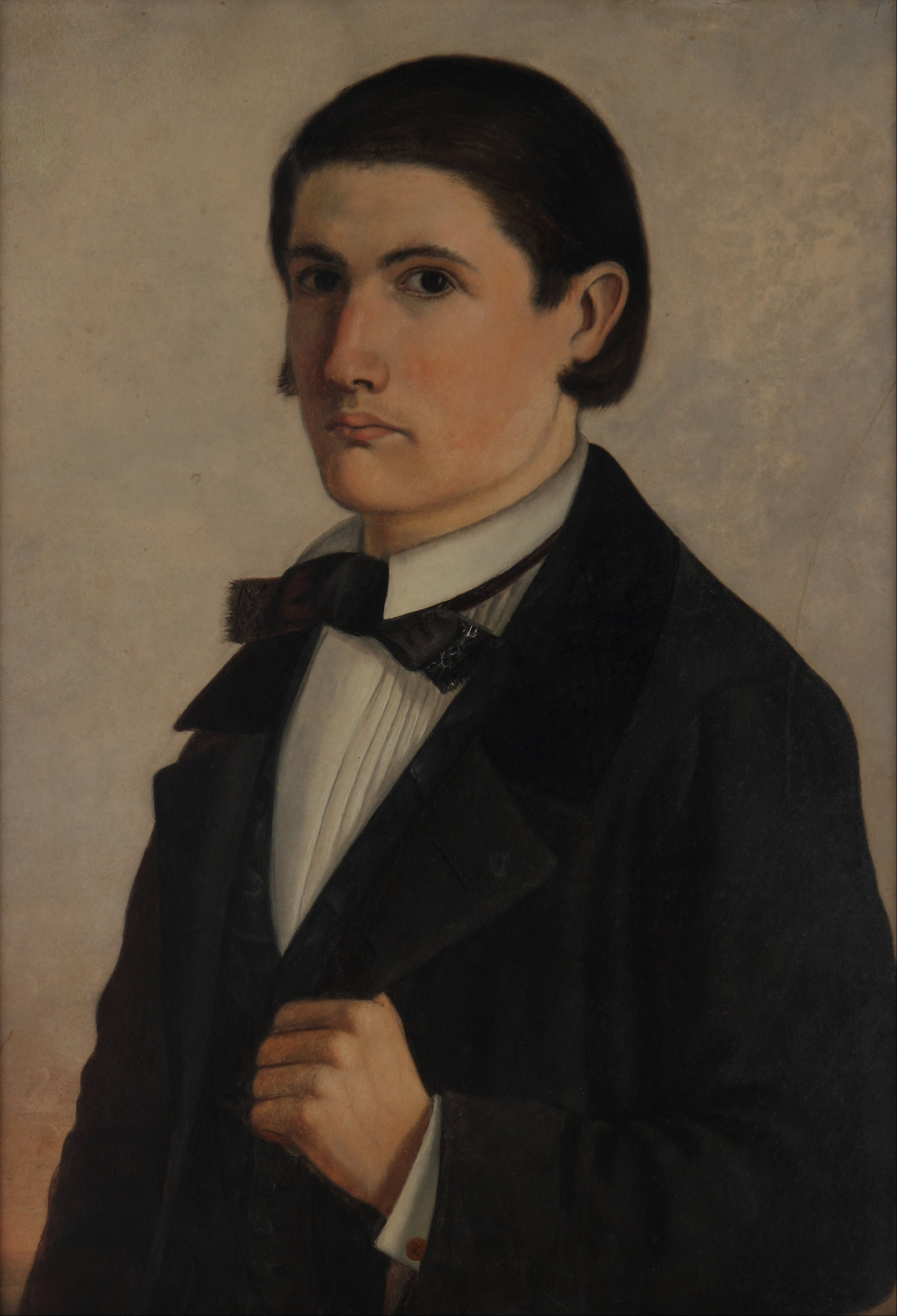
An early self-portrait (1858)

It seems to have been López's principal intention as an artist to document war scenes, but only certain “epic” moments, yet without including any eloquence and chauvinism. He also tried to remain “neutral” from the Triple Alliance's (Brazil, Argentina, and Uruguay) perspective and seems to have made a sincere effort.

Curiously, his war paintings do not communicate a war emotion, or even suffering; more they appear to be a series of valuable “post cards”. Cándido López appeared to try to avoid the suffering painted in the curious scenes where sometimes the eye searches for rest in the natural landscape, serene and neutral where the tragedy occurs.

In the same way, the soldiers from both sides appeared more than anything like tiny shadows that move with solemn and variegated colors. The painting of this war is nightmarish, as he painted the movements of variegated masses under serene landscapes and in certain cases of a dream. For example, in Empedrado (Corrientes) Empedrado, between beautiful palm trees of Yatay (Battle of Yatay), or under a glowing sky – which occurs in the painting called “Invernada del ejército oriental”.

He calls attention to the unusual format of its landscape which is very horizontal, in a proportion of one to three (for example 40 x 120 cm o 48.5 x 152 cm). The specific proportion has permitted it to stand out with great detail with multiple and simultaneous actions. Despite the dimensions of the works, he describes the natural scenarios of the episodes, while making all the images with the bare minimum material. Although López initially utilized a triangular perspective close to the ground and the scene, later he changed to another perspective. The perspective would become a striking feature for him: two points of view that are very elevated, dispel even more the depth of the perspectives, carrying the gaze towards distant horizons where the war is blurred and appears to be stunned...For example, the soft sunset colors are used is an attempt to distance himself from the drama. His pictorial structures are firm and simple between the plane of the earth and of the heavens.

== Selected paintings ==
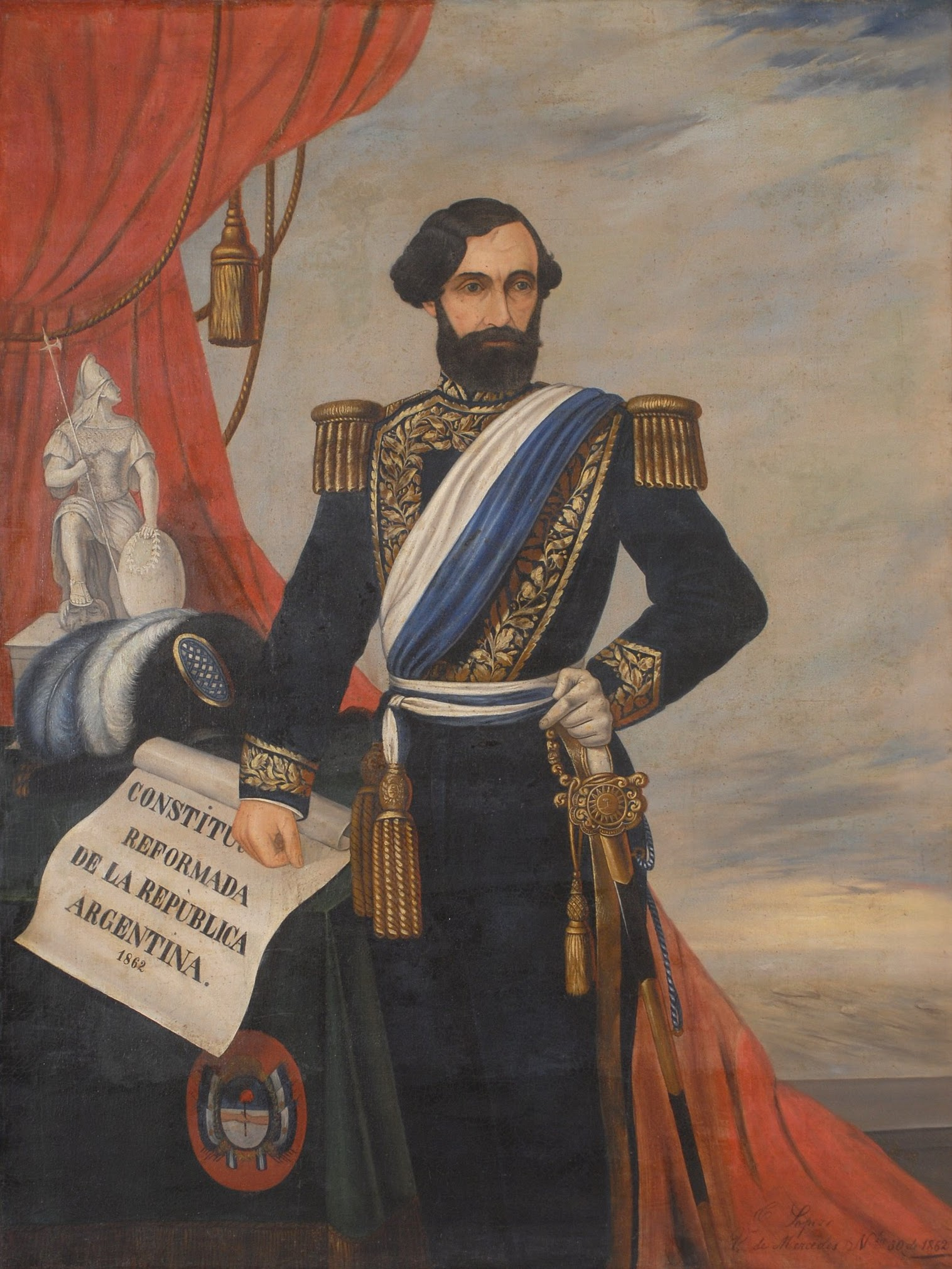
Portrait of president Bartolomé Mitre

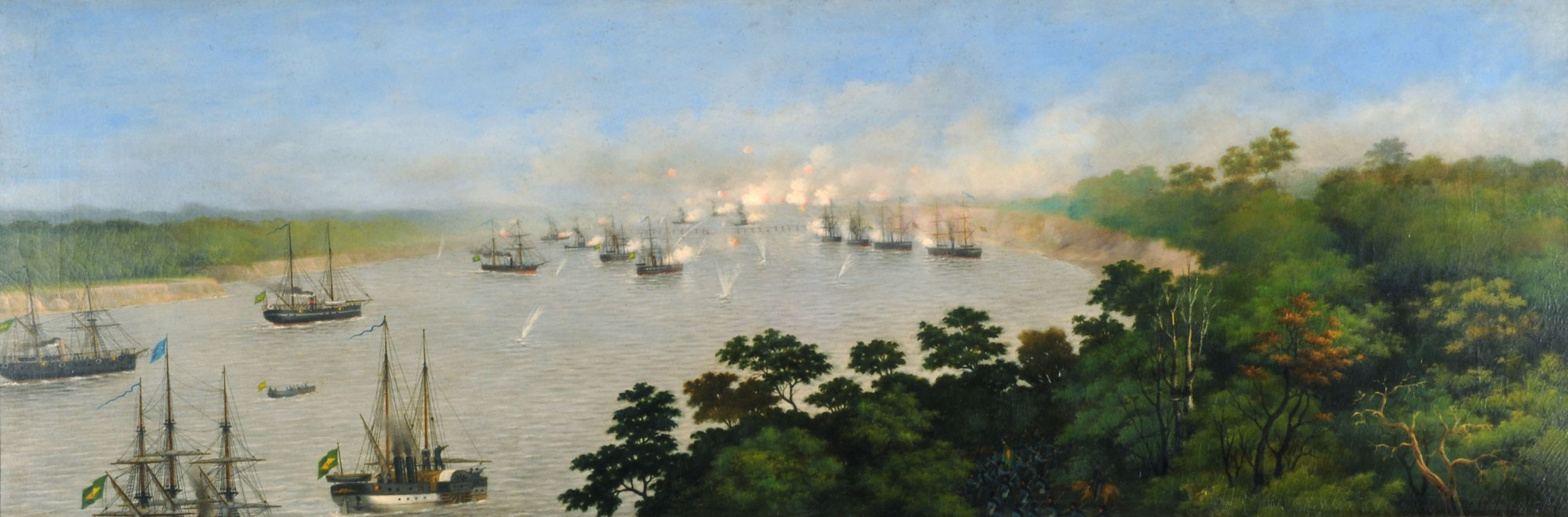
Attack of the Brazilian ships on Curupayty (detail)

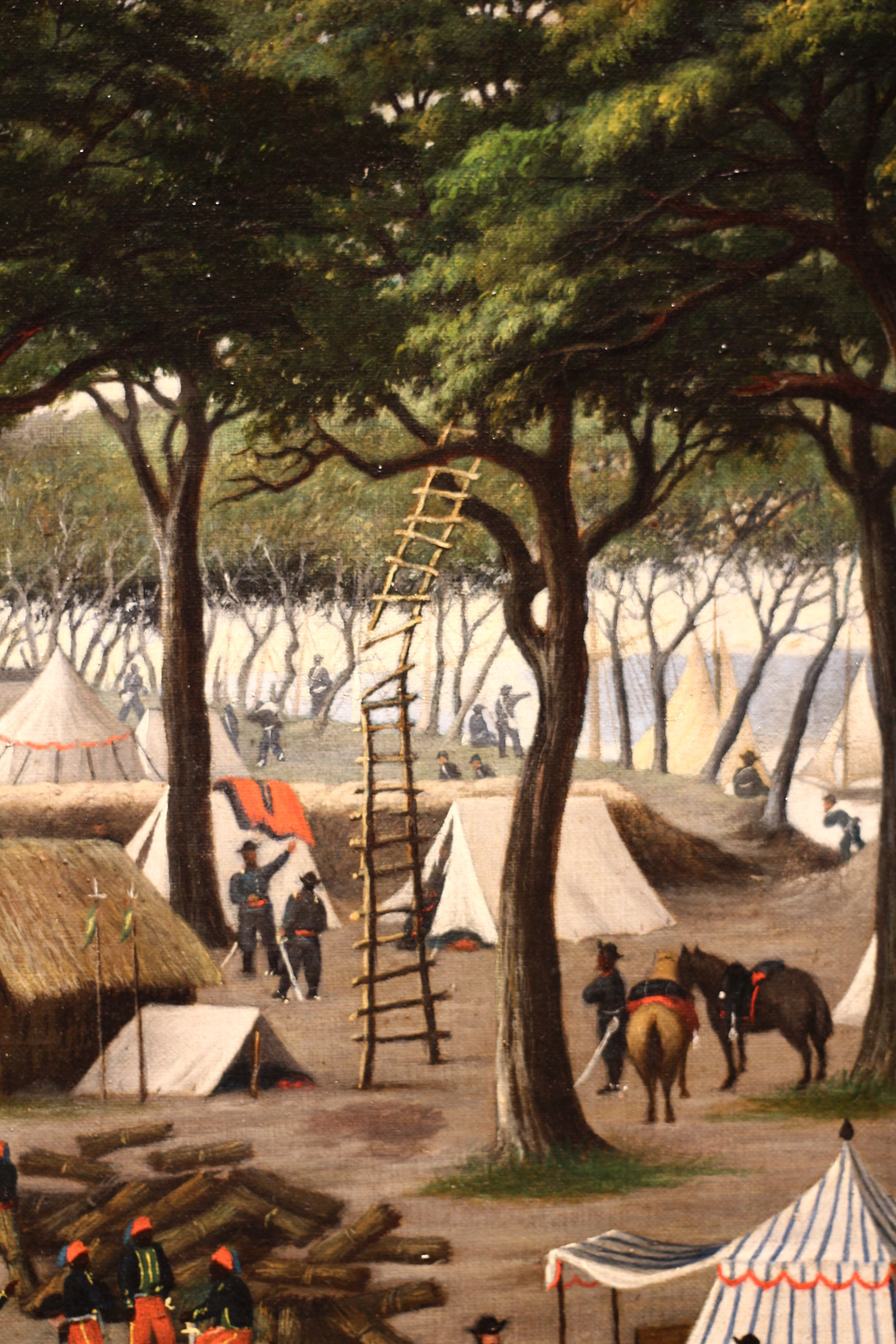
Interior view of Curuzú (detail)

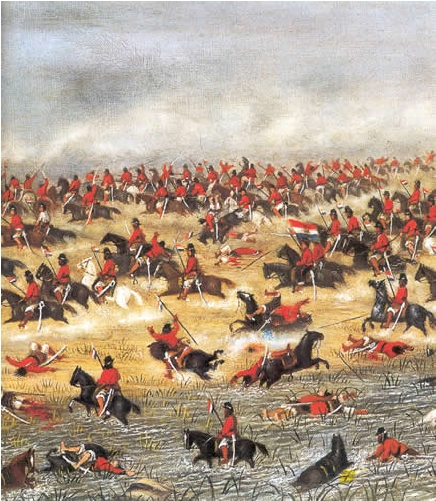
Battle of Tuyutí (detail)
