= Empedrado =

Empedrado may refer to:

- Empedrado, Chile
- Empedrado, Corrientes
- Empedrado Department
- Fundo Pichilemo de Empedrado
