= Pichilemo (disambiguation) =

Pichilemo is the original spelling of the commune of Pichilemu, Chile.

Pichilemo or Pichilemu may also refer to:

== Geography ==
- San Antonio de Petrel, a Chilean hacienda also known as Pichilemo
- Pichilemu, Valparaíso, a village in the commune of La Ligua, Valparaíso Region

== Media ==
- Pichilemu (newspaper)
- Pichilemu News, an online newspaper published by Washington Saldías González
