= León de Pallejas =

Spanish military personnel

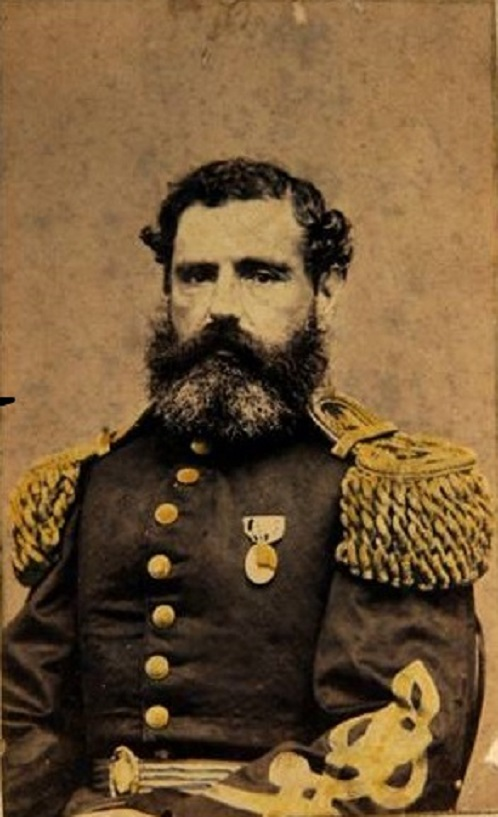
- Born: 1816; Seville, Andalusia, Spain
- Died: July 18, 1866 (aged 50); Ñeembucú, Paraguay
- Military career
- Allegiance: Spain; Carlists; Uruguay
- Branch: Spanish Army; National Army of Uruguay
- Service years: 1833 — 1866
- Rank: General
- Unit: Florida Battalion
- Conflicts: First Carlist War; Argentine Civil Wars; Uruguayan Civil War; Paraguayan War; Battle of Yatay; Siege of Uruguaiana; Battle of Estero Bellaco; Battle of Tuyutí; Battle of Boquerón †

José Pons de Ojeda (1816 – July 18, 1866), later known as León de Palleja[s], was a Uruguayan general of Spanish origin who participated in the First Carlist War, the Argentine Civil Wars and the Paraguayan War.

== Biography ==
Pallejas was born as the son of Manuel Pons de Palleja who was a surgeon in the Spanish Army and María de los Reyes de Ojeda. He fought in the First Carlist War on the side of Carlos María Isidro de Borbón. When the Carlists were defeated, he changed his name and fled to France, from where he emigrated to Uruguay .

He worked as a merchant in Paysandú, but when Manuel Oribe returned to Uruguay in 1842, after the Battle of Arroyo Grande, he accompanied the withdrawal of Fructuoso Rivera's supporters to Montevideo, and joined the Colorado Party.

Curiously, he served a year as a private and only later did he present himself to General José María Paz, identifying himself as a career officer. In the defense against the Great Siege of Montevideo, he began to show his qualities, recognized by his own and enemies: courage, ability to command and cruelty. He was well liked by his soldiers, whom he treated almost as equals. He was then promoted to the rank of colonel.

He joined the campaign of the Ejército Grande of Justo José de Urquiza against Juan Manuel de Rosas and fought in the Battle of Caseros as head of the "Voltígeros" battalion. He was the first to enter El Palomar de Caseros, where the Rosas forces hospital had been organized. Because Rosas's soldiers in the hospital were unaware of the surrender of their superiors, killing the platoon that showed up to receive the surrender, he ordered the wounded in the hospital to be killed with a bayonet. When the senior surgeon Claudio Mamerto Cuenca tried to dissuade him, he pierced him with his sword.

Back in Montevideo, he seconded General César Díaz in the revolution that overthrew President Juan Francisco Giró in July 1853. He supported the new president, Venancio Flores, and withdrew when he was overthrown. He dedicated himself to rural tasks in his stay in the Durazno Department.

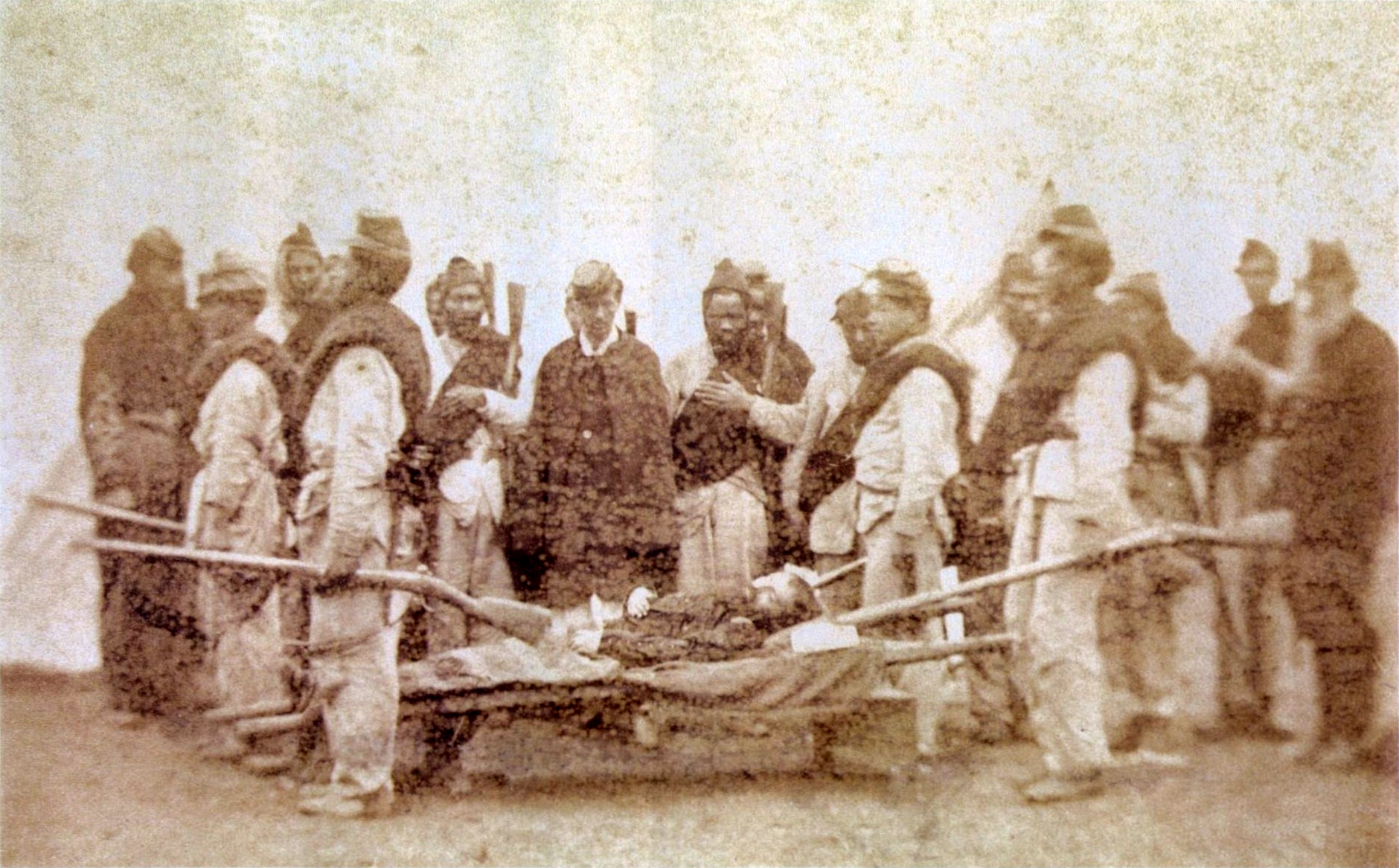
Palleja is removed dead from the Boquerón battlefield in an image captured by Bate & Cia photographers

When Venancio Flores invaded the country in 1863, President Bernardo Prudencio Berro had Pallejas imprisoned as a possible ally of Flores. He was released after the fall of Berro and formed the "Florida" battalion, with which he marched to the Paraguayan War. While privately opposed to that war, he led his battalion very effectively.

He was a very cruel leader to enemies, although there were times when he was even too lenient. He was considered insensitive to his own sufferings. He was friendly with his subordinates, even his soldiers, but in battle he transformed and demanded the maximum: he yelled and insulted his subordinates, and exposed himself to unnecessary risks. On one occasion he sent the band of his regiment to the rear. When told that this violated the Regulations, he replied: "In order to die, you don't need regulations."

From the front he sent sixty letters to the Montevideo newspapers, which became one of the key sources of historical information for the war. He fought under the orders of Flores in the Battle of Yatay, in the Siege of Uruguaiana, in Estero Bellaco and in the bloody victory of Tuyutí.

In the Battle of Boquerón he repeated his exploits, but was killed during the battle. A photo of him from a few days before that battle is preserved, and of his soldiers moving his body, both obtained by the photographers Bate & Cia. He was promoted post mortem to the rank of general.
