= Battle of Estero Bellaco =

Part of the Paraguayan War

Coordinates: 27.1833°S 57.8833°W

- Part of the Humaitá campaign
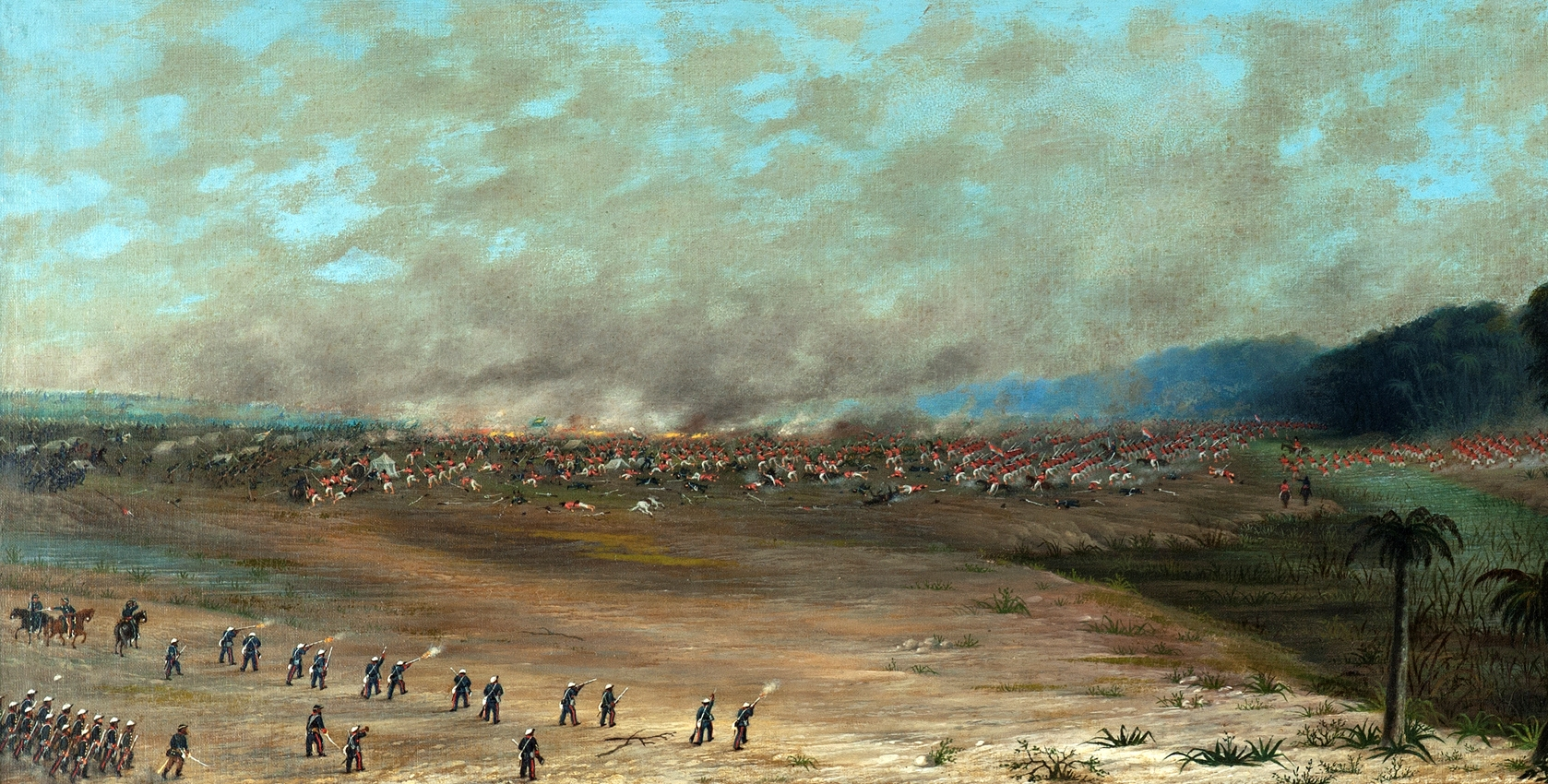
- Detail from a painting by Cándido López
Date	2 May 1866
Location	Ñeembucú Department, Paraguay
Result	Allied victory

Belligerents
Paraguay	Argentina; Empire of Brazil; Uruguay

Commanders and leaders
José E. Diaz; José María Bruguez	Venancio Flores; Manuel Luís Osório

Strength
5,000–7,000	At least 11 battalions of infantry two artillery batteries two cavalry regiments (About 8,000)

Casualties and losses
2,500 casualties 4 cannons lost	1,560 casualties 4 cannons lost

The Battle of Estero Bellaco was one of the bloodiest battles of the Paraguayan War. The battle was fought on 2 May 1866 with the Paraguayan Army suffering 2,000 casualties among the dead and wounded. Likewise, 300 of their men were taken prisoner by the troops belonging to the Triple Alliance: Argentina, Brazil and Uruguay. The allies lost nearly 2,000 men, mostly wounded, and the Uruguayan troops of General Venancio Flores - commanded by León de Pallejas - were severely decimated, accounting for the vast majority of allied deaths.

This estuary is located in the Department of Ñeembucú, Paraguay, on the banks of the river of the same name. To the south is the Argentine Republic.

== Background ==
On 16 April 1866, Allied troops under the command of General Osório, crossed the River Paraguay and attacked Fort Itapirú and Paso de la Patria. By the 23rd, the Paraguayans had retreated behind the great marsh of Estero Bellaco. The Allied vanguard, under the command of General Flores, was camped on the southern edge of the marsh, with four Uruguayan battalions and their artillery battery, six Brazilian infantry battalions including an artillery battery, a Brazilian cavalry regiment, and further behind, elements of an Argentinian infantry battalion and a cavalry regiment. Flores' forces included: the Brazilian 5th, 7th, 3rd, 16th, 21st and 38th Voluntarios da Patria, the Uruguayan 24 de Abril, Florida, Independencia and Libertad, and the Argentinian Rosario. Nearby was the main Allied army camped north of Paso de Patria. On 2 May 1866, President López sent 4,500 Paraguayan infantry against this Allied vanguard.

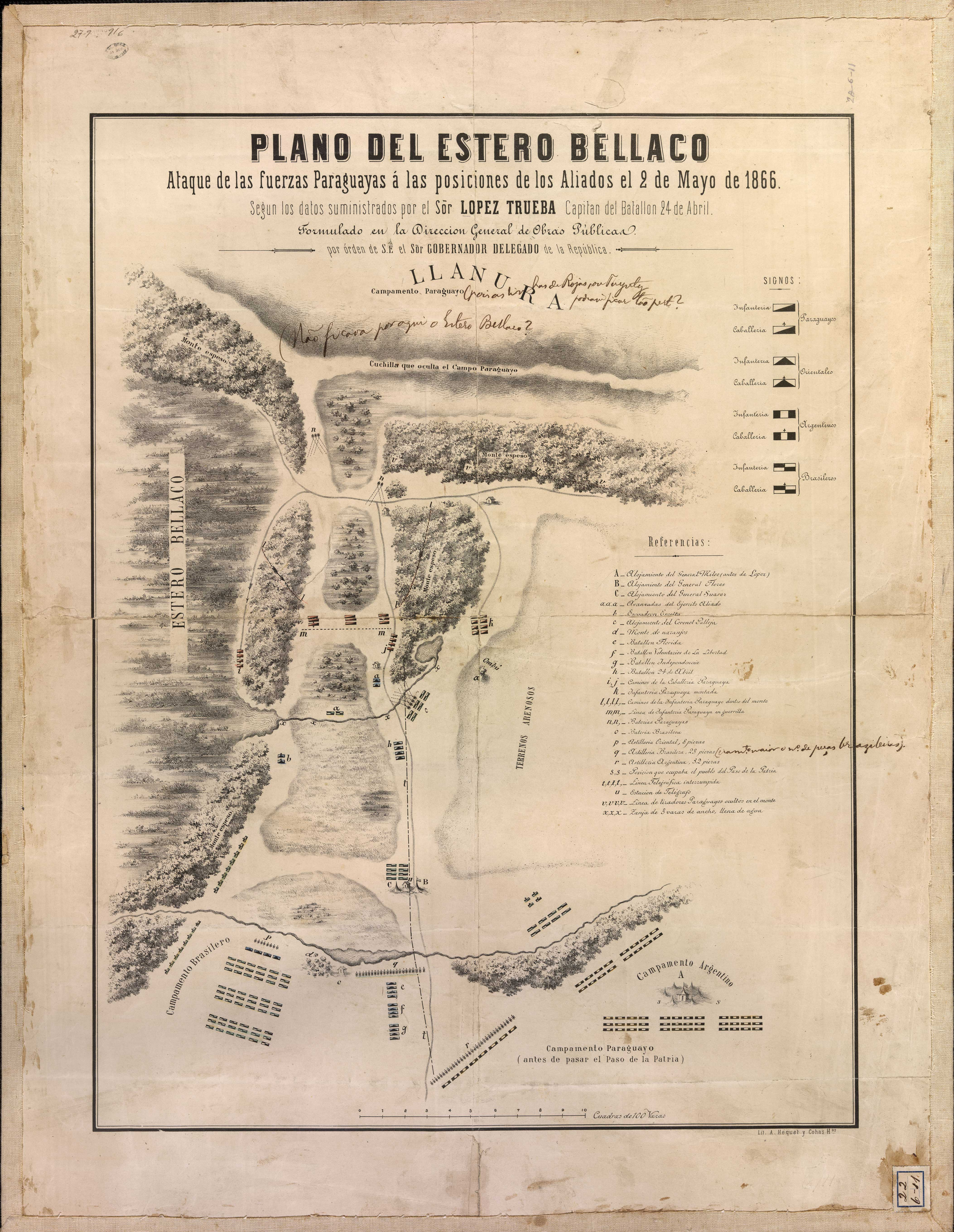
Map showing position of forces at the battle of Estero Bellaco 2nd May 1866

== The battle ==
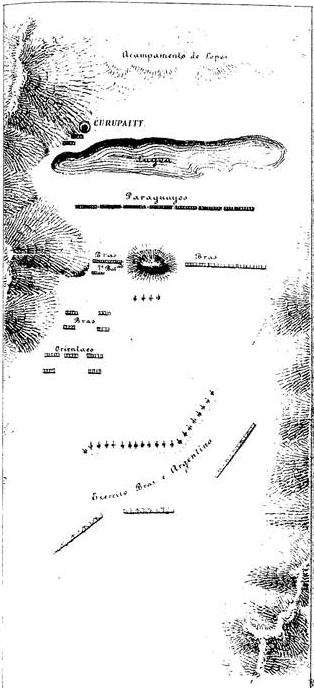
Map showing the positions of the opposing forces on the 2 May at Estero Bellaco

On 16 April 1866, Brazilian troops under the command of General Osório crossed the river and settled in the Itapirú Fort. Then, on the same day, General Flores crossed at the head of the First Corps of the Argentine Army and a Uruguayan infantry division. The next day Paunero's troops did.

General Flores and his vanguard, commanded by the Spanish mercenary León de Palleja, stationed in Estero Bellaco, was attacked on 2 May by a Paraguayan force of 6,000 men with four pieces of artillery. The Paraguayans practically overwhelmed the allied troops, in complete confusion until they were assisted by twelve reserve battalions.

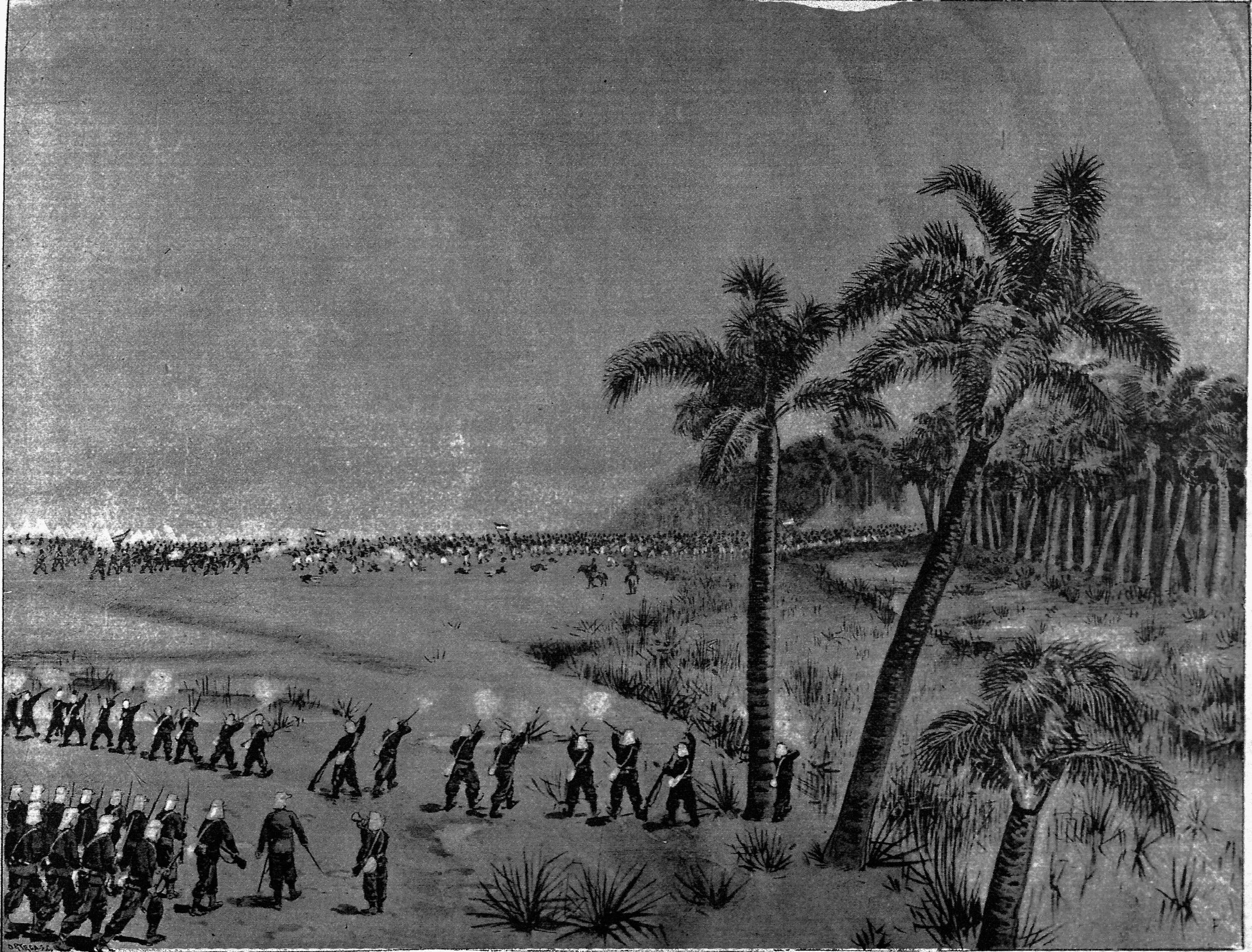
Combat of 2 May 1866 at Estero Bellaco: Attack of the vanguard of the allied army by the division of the Paraguayan lieutenant colonel José E. Díaz

On 2 May 1866, Marshal López ordered an offensive reconnaissance to the south of Estero Bellaco. The allied forces entered the Paraguayan field. The opposing army fell back without resistance. Everything predicted a near and certain success. Following in the footsteps of López's troops, they advanced along the royal road of Humaitá, until they reached, without difficulty, the Estero Bellaco del Sur, in whose vicinity the vanguard, composed of four Uruguayan battalions, four Brazilian battalions, four pieces of artillery camped, some riograndense cavalry regiments and two hundred horsemen from General Flores' private escort. In total, more than eight thousand men from the three arms.

The position of Flores' forces was, as follows, at that time:

The four Brazilian battalions were camped behind a soft blade. The 7th Battalion, which was the most advanced, protected the four pieces of the 1st Artillery Regiment. Eight hundred meters to the rear were the 21st and 38th Corps of "Volunteers of the Homeland." The Uruguayan battalions Veinticuatro de Abril, Florida, Independencia and Libertad occupied the left of the imperial troops. The Spanish Palleja commanded the Florida and Veinticuatro de Abril battalions, made up largely of Spanish, Italian and even Swiss mercenaries among the Colorados of Uruguay.

Combat of 2 May 1866 in the Estero Bellaco Sud: attack by the vanguard of the Allied Army by the division of Paraguayan Lieutenant Colonel José E. Díaz, later General.

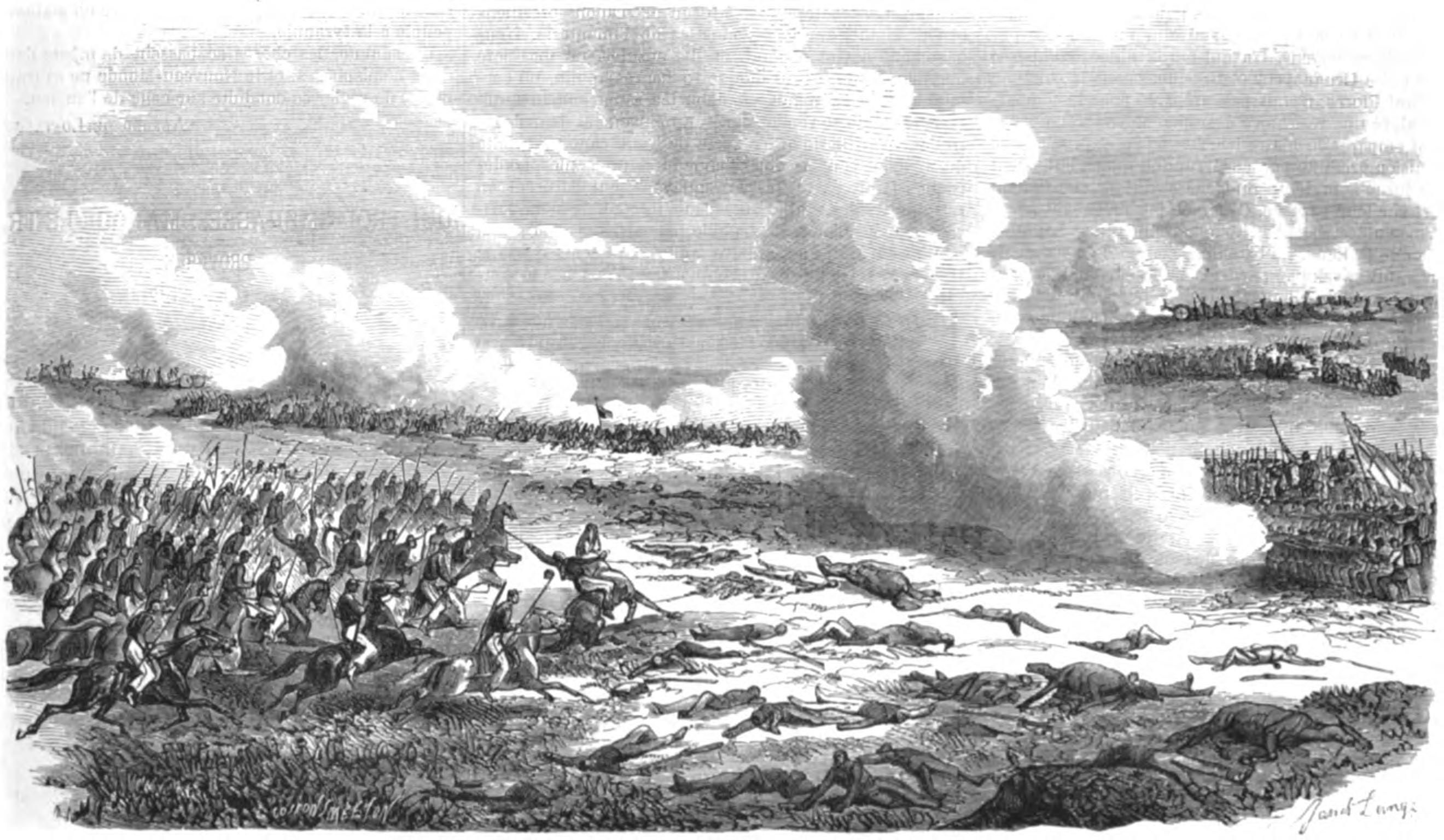
Battle of Estero Bellaco, 2 May 1866(L'Illustration: journal universel, Vol. XLVIII, nº 1.227, 1º/09/1866)

At twelve o'clock, when the allies were surrendering to devour the ranch, the Paraguayans burst through the three passes of the Estero, overwhelming the outposts of the vanguard. The push of the Paraguayan cavalry at first sowed confusion among the Argentine and eastern forces that retreated, being pursued. Venancio Flores himself was on the verge of being captured in the skirmish, but was able to flee with a stroke of luck. Spare and reorganized with the support of the Brazilian rearguard commanded by Osorio, the allies were able to exercise better resistance to the Paraguayan attack that was unleashed.

Episode of the 1st Line Cavalry of the Argentine Army in the Combat of Estero Bellaco (reduced reproduction of a plate drawn by the distinguished artist Francisco Fortuny).

Indeed, when the vanguard of the allied army had been defeated, Colonel José Eduvigis Díaz, commander of the Paraguayan troops, wanted to go even further. Instead of ordering the withdrawal immediately, since the objective of the operation had already been fulfilled, he engaged in a reckless pursuit to crash into the bulk of the allied army. The charge was made by Colonel Elizardo Aquino, who collided with the already recovered allied troops and had to withstand the pressure of all the power of the opponent. Casualties were high for both sides. The Brazilian intervention in the rear was crucial to prevent a deeper penetration of the Paraguayans.

On the other side of the Estero, Díaz made an enveloping movement of the Brazilian troops fail, attempted by Paso Sidra, repelled them twice with the bayonet, forcing them to flee.

Although the casualties were almost similar for both sides (similar death toll with more wounded on the allied side), the Paraguayan objectives of ambushing the enemy and stealing various pieces of artillery and ammunition were achieved. The Paraguayans were able to get 4 pieces of artillery and several carts full of modern weapons that served to alleviate the shortage of material that was beginning to be felt in Solano López's camp.

== Aftermath ==
Gen. Flores wrote to his wife, "In the future my vanguard will be composed of Argentines."

== Bibliography ==
- Donato, Hernâni (1987). Dicionário das Batalhas Brasileiras (in Portuguese). São Paulo: Ibrasa.
