= Guilherme Xavier de Sousa =

Marshal Guilherme Xavier de Sousa
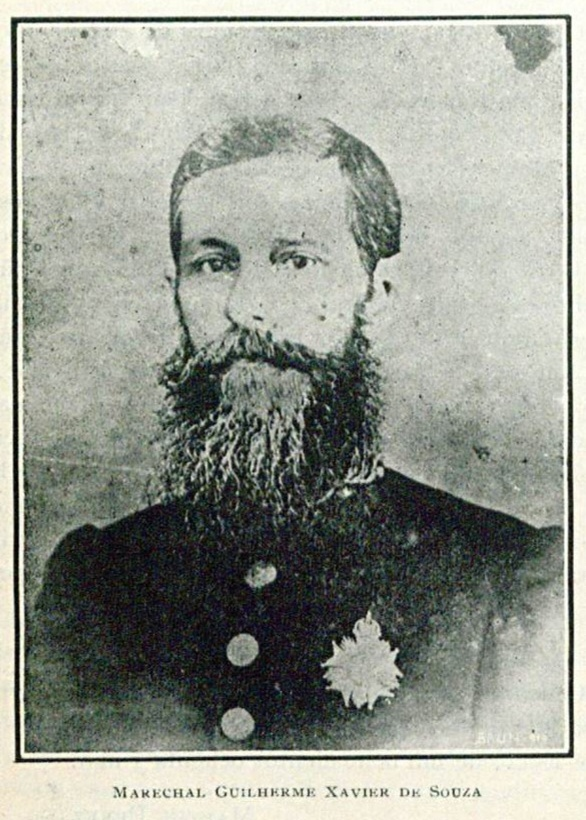

42nd Governor of Rio Grande do Sul
- In office 14 July 1868 – 1 August 1868
- Monarch: Pedro II
- Prime Minister: Viscount of Itaboraí
- Preceded by: Joaquim Vieira da Cunha
- Succeeded by: Israel Rodrigues Barcelos

Personal details
- Born: 3 July 1818 Desterro, Santa Catarina, Brazil
- Died: 21 December 1870 (aged 52) Desterro, Santa Catarina, Brazil
- Relations: Cruz e Sousa (foster son)

Military service
- Allegiance: Brazil
- Branch: Imperial Brazilian Army
- Years of service: 1834–1870
- Rank: Marshal
- Battles/wars: Farroupilha Revolution; Liberal rebellions of 1842; Paraguayan War; Humaitá campaign; Battle of Boquerón

Guilherme Xavier de Sousa (3 July 1818 – 21 December 1870) was a Brazilian marshal and politician who participated in the Paraguayan War as well as other conflicts. He was also the 42nd governor of Rio Grande do Sul from 14 July to 1 August 1868.

== Biography ==
Guilherme Xavier was the son of Captain Antônio Xavier de Sousa.

His military career began on 20 November 1834, when he was enlisted as a soldier, and as a 2nd class cadet on 17 December 1834. He fought against the Farroupilhas, during the Ragamuffin War, and against the Paulistas of the Liberal rebellions of 1842. On 8 June 1865, Guilherme Xavier de Souza joined the Imperial Brazilian Army at the camp located in Vila de Concórdia in the Argentine Province of Entre Ríos. In 1867 he was promoted to field marshal the province of Rio Grande do Sul, and in 1868 the Minister of War, the Baron of Muritiba, ordered him to embark for Paraguay to replace the Marquis of Caxias in the Command of the Brazilian forces. On 18 January 1869, he took command of Brazilian soldiers until he passed the command to the Count of Eu on 19 April 1869.

He was a deputy to the Provincial Legislative Assembly of Santa Catarina in the 15th legislature (1864–1865), as a summoned alternate and in the 17th legislature (1868 — 1869). He was governor of Rio Grande do Sul from 14 July to 1 August 1868.

He was married to Clara Angélica Xavier Fagundes, and they had no children. He was the lord of João da Cruz, who was freed when he was only four years old and treated João as the couple's foster son and soon became the precursor poet of Symbolism in Brazil. Guilherme was also an abolitionist at a time when the struggle to end slavery hadn't yet been abolished in Brazil.

Guilherme Xavier returned from Paraguay on 18 May 1869, already ill, and died on 21 December 1870, in the city of Desterro at the age of 52.

In his honor, the 10th Mountain Light Infantry Battalion, in Juiz de Fora, Minas Gerais was named as Battalion Marechal Guilherme Xavier de Sousa. There is a street in Florianópolis bearing his name known as Rua Marechal Guilherme.
