= José E. Díaz =

Paraguayan general (1833–1867)

José Eduvigis Díaz
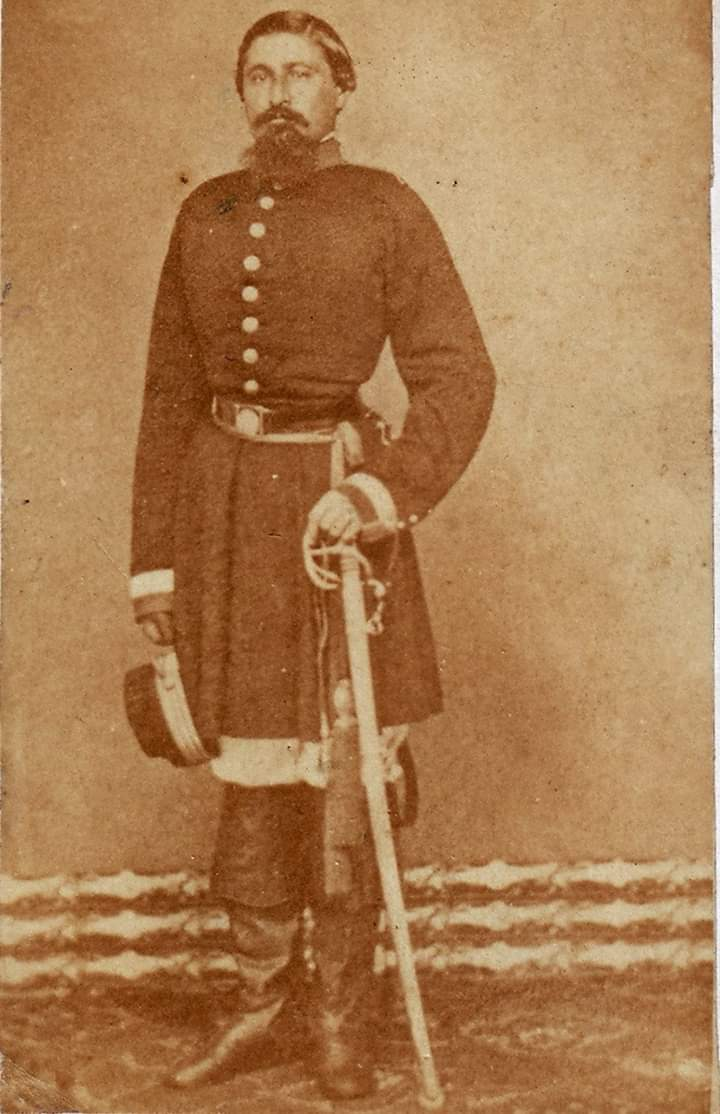
- Born: 17 October 1833; Pirayú, Paraguay
- Died: 7 February 1867 (aged 33); Paso Pucú, Paraguay
- Military career
- Allegiance: Paraguay
- Branch: Paraguayan Army
- Service years: 1852–1867
- Rank: Brigadier General
- Conflicts: Paraguayan War

José Eduvigis Díaz Vera (17 October 1833 – 7 February 1867) was a Paraguayan general. Díaz was born in the town of Cerro Verá east of Pirayú in the department of Paraguarí. His parents were Juan Andrés Díaz and Dolores Vera.

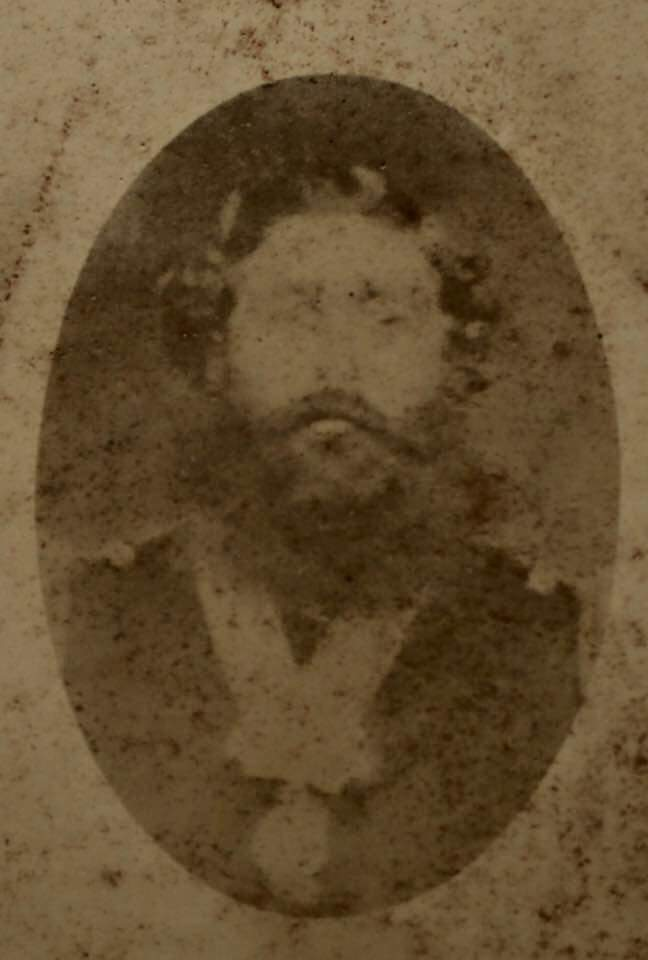
General José Eduvigis Díaz

In 1852 he joined the militia and later led Battalion #40 of the police. He became the police chief in Asunción and first distinguished himself on raids across the Paraná River at Corrientes in the spring of 1866 during the Paraguayan War. Díaz was the hero of the September 22, 1866 battle of Curupaity, leading a humiliating defeat of the allied forces.

Barely four months later, however, on 26 January 1867, a Brazilian shell exploded over general Díaz's canoe while he was fishing in the Paraguay River, outside the camp at Curupayty. President Francisco Solano López visited the wounded Díaz every day. Díaz's leg was amputated by doctors, but he still died on 7 February 1867.

In addition to the battle of Curupayty, Díaz participated in the battles of Pehuajó, Estero Bellaco, Tuyutí (in which he commanded the Paraguayans against the combined allied forces), Boquerón, and Sauce.

After his death, his coffin was brought to Asunción, where the town accompanied it to its resting place in the Recoleta neighborhood. In 1939, Díaz's remains were deposited in an urn in the National Pantheon of the Heroes, along with the remains of Carlos Antonio López.

== Honors ==
Paraguay's Ruta 4 highway is named after him. He appears on the 100 Guaraní coin.
