= José Murature =

Argentinian painter (1804–1880)

José Félix Murature
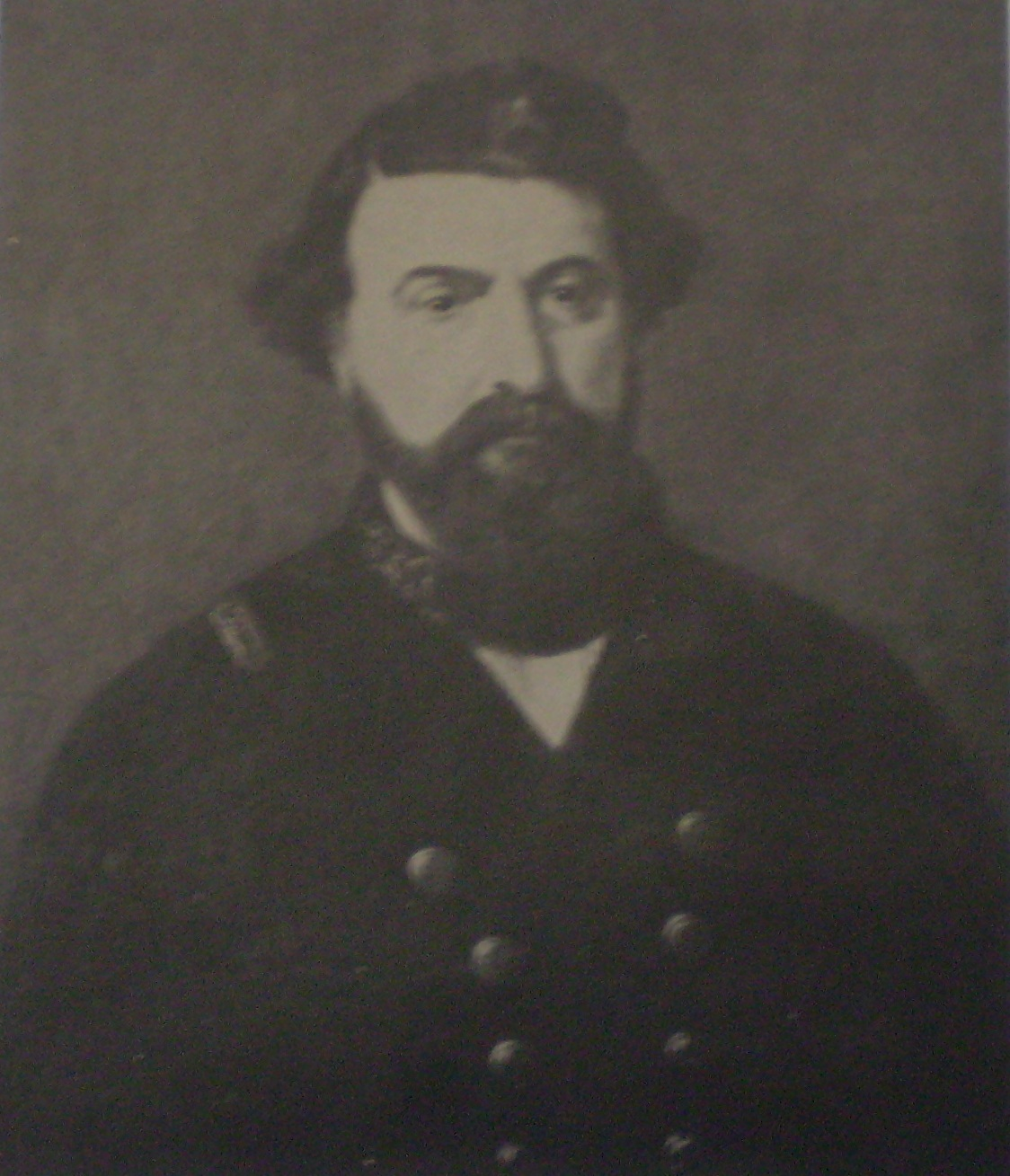
- Born: 1804; Genoa, Ligurian Republic
- Died: August 9, 1880 (aged 76); Buenos Aires, Buenos Aires Province, Argentina
- Burial place: La Recoleta Cemetery, Buenos Aires, Buenos Aires Province, Argentina
- Military career
- Allegiance: United Provinces of the Río de la Plata; Unitarios; Argentina
- Branch: Argentine Navy
- Service years: 1826 – 1870
- Rank: Commodore
- Conflicts: Argentine Civil Wars; Battle of Caseros; Siege of Buenos Aires; Battle of Cepeda; Battle of Pavón; Cisplatine War; Paraguayan War; Battle of Paso de Cuevas
- Other work: Painter

José Félix Murature (1804-1880) was a commodore of the Argentine Navy and a painter of Italian origin who served in several conflits including the Argentine Civil Wars, the Cisplatine War and the Paraguayan War.

== Arrival at the Río de la Plata ==
Murtature was born in Genoa during the War of the Third Coalition. At the age of 11, he started as a midshipman on a French war frigate. During his youth he traveled in the Atlantic Ocean several times, reaching Brazil twice.

In 1825 he arrived in Buenos Aires, a few weeks before the declaration of war by the Empire of Brazil. For a time, he worked with an uncle who owned merchant ships in Montevideo which was occupied by the Brazilians, and then returned to Buenos Aires.

In January 1826 he enlisted in the fleet organized by Captain Guillermo Brown, and soon became an expert in river navigation on the Río de la Plata, Paraná and Uruguay. He was put in command of a small scout ship, which was very useful to Brown for information about the enemy fleet. He also transported troops to the Banda Oriental.

When the war ended, he devoted himself to river trade, and rose to the rank of captain. He spent many years in this activity, until around 1840 he took refuge in Montevideo, as a member of the Unitarian Party. He served in the small fleet of the besieged city, and for a time accompanied the privateer José Garibaldi on his excursion through the Paraná. He also stood out for transporting exiles from Buenos Aires to Montevideo, when this activity was really dangerous.

== The Buenos Aires Squadron ==
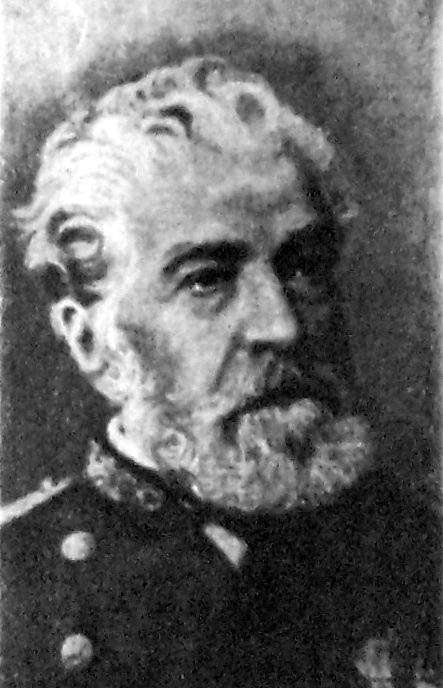
José Murature

He returned to Buenos Aires some time after the Battle of Caseros. After the revolution of September 11, 1852, he enlisted as a major in the Buenos Aires fleet, commanding the schooner Santa Clara. The Buenos Aires squad, made up of six ships, was placed under the command of the Polish sailor Floriano Zurowski. On April 18 of the following year, they were defeated by the Confederation squad in front of Martín García Island.

Zurowski was relieved, and in his place Murature was appointed commander. He took command of the schooner 9 de Julio, with which he had to defend the port of the city against the Federalist attack. The relative triumph earned him promotion to colonel in the navy.

After the betrayal of the American captain John Halstead Coe, which meant the end of the Siege of Buenos Aires, he remained as commander of the Buenos Aires navy, during six years of partial confrontations.

Shortly before the Battle of Cepeda, in 1859, he forced the passage of the Rosario batteries and stood in front of the city of Paraná. There he faced the crew of his ship, who mutinied to go over to the Confederacy. In the Pinto uprising, he was seriously wounded and witnessed the death of his son Alejandro, murdered by the mutineers. The flagship was incorporated into the federal fleet; for several weeks, all of Buenos Aires believed that Captain Murature had also passed. He remained a prisoner of President Justo José de Urquiza, who released him shortly after the Pact of San José de Flores.

He supported the operations of the Buenos Aires army before and after the Battle of Pavón, but his role was not very prominent. At the end of 1861 he was appointed commander of the national squad and was known as Commodore, although he did not have the rank. Only in 1874 was he given the rank of colonel in the navy.

== Paraguayan War ==
In January 1865 he commanded the Argentine squadron that gave support to the attack of the forces of Venancio Flores and his Brazilian allies on Paysandú; and intervened to try to prevent the murder of its defenders.

Shortly after, partly due to the siege and capture of Paysandú, the Paraguayan War begun. Murature was the chief of the Argentine fleet in that war. He participated in the Battle of Corrientes and Battle of Paso de Cuevas, in August 1865. A Brazilian naval division that had joined his ship, the "National Guard" crossed the Paraguayan defense lines and their artillery, located in the ravines of the Paraná River. They managed to overcome the obstacle, but Murature decided to stop the ship to prolong the artillery duel. The result was the near destruction of the ship and fifteen deaths, including the son of the future Commodore Luis Py, who commanded the ship.

During almost all the rest of the war there were no naval battles, so it was dedicated to the transport of troops to the south of Paraguay; the naval war remained the responsibility of the imperial squad of Tamandaré, which had a poor performance.

== Later years ==
He retired from the Argentine Navy after the end of the war, except for a sporadic service during the repression of the Entre Ríos leader Ricardo López Jordán.

He dedicated himself to painting naval scenes and portraits of the ships of the Argentine Navy. His paintings are of remarkable quality, especially notable for coming from such a high-ranking naval officer.

He died in Buenos Aires in August 1880. His remains rest in La Recoleta Cemetery, Buenos Aires.
