= Capture of the steamer Marquês de Olinda =

Capture of the Marquês de Olinda
- Part of the Paraguayan War
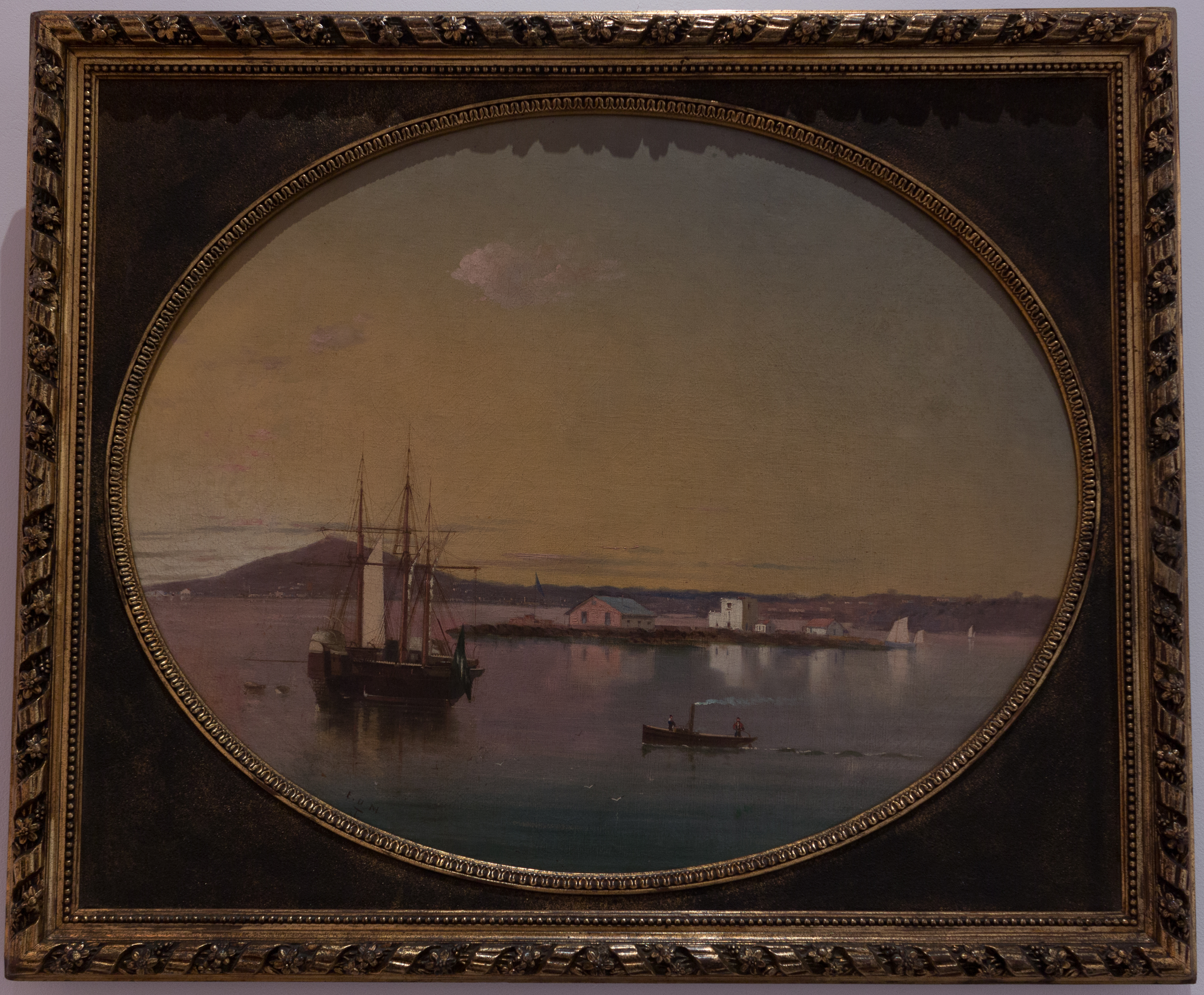
- The steamer Marquês de Olinda
Date	12 November 1864
Location	Paraguay River, Paraguay
Result	Paraguayan victory: The Brazilian ship is captured by the Paraguayans.

Belligerents
Paraguay	Empire of Brazil

Commanders and leaders
Francisco Solano López	Manoel Souto (POW)

Strength
1 corvette	1 steamer

Casualties and losses
None	Ship and crew captured

The Capture of the steamer Marquês de Olinda, also called the Battle of Potrero-Poña, was a Paraguayan naval action carried out on 12 November 1864, in Potrero-Poña, on the Paraguay River, which consisted of the capture of the Brazilian merchant ship and all on board. Paraguayan president Solano López ordered the imprisonment in response to the Brazilian invasion of Uruguay, before any formal declaration of war between Paraguay and the Empire of Brazil.

Since the time when Carlos Antônio López ruled Paraguay, there was already disagreement between both countries, albeit peacefully, on territorial and border issues. With the rise of Solano López to power, these disagreements became more aggressive, as López expanded his foreign policy, reaching an understanding with Argentine and Uruguayan leaders in order to facilitate Paraguay's access to the sea through the Río de la Plata. Despite this, there was nothing between the Empire of Brazil and Paraguay to justify any military action on the part of those involved. However, with the Uruguayan War underway, the Uruguayans tried to pressure López to help them against the Brazilians by sending agents to persuade him and also to gather information that was relevant to the Uruguayan cause.

One of the agents discovered that Marquês de Olinda, en route to Corumbá, was carrying the newly appointed president of the Mato Grosso province, and informed López the ship carried "armaments and valuable cargo", advising him to seize it. It was a Uruguayan attempt to get the Paraguayans to act in order to distract Brazil from its territory. López followed the advice and imprisoned the ship on 12 November 1864, before it had left Paraguay. All Brazilian passengers, crew and officers, were incarcerated, and most of the latter died from torture, starvation and lack of medical care. Only two officers survived arrest, being released in 1869.

The capture of the Marquês de Olinda triggered events that led to the beginning of the Paraguayan War, although the true origin of the conflict is a reason for disagreement among historians. After the capture, the Paraguayans converted the vessel into a warship and used it in the invasion of Mato Grosso and the Battle of Riachuelo. In the latter, the vessel was rammed by the Brazilian frigate Amazonas and capsized, after which it was dismantled and set on fire.

== Background ==
=== The ship ===
Marquês de Olinda was built at the Estabelecimento de Fundição e Estaleiros Ponta da Areia, in Niterói, in the late 1850s. It was made of wood, driven by side wheels and masts. It had a low draft suitable for river navigation, displaced 180 tons and had an 80 hp steam engine. The ship was commissioned on 8 November 1859 and its first captain was second lieutenant João Frederico Berrizo. Its name was a tribute to prime minister, regent and president of the Imperial Council Pedro de Araújo Lima, the Marquis of Olinda. The ship's first trip took place on 27 November of that year, on the Montevideo-Corumbá-Montevideo route. On this trip, it took about 70 passengers of various nationalities. Later, the vessel would make this trip eight times a year.

With the companies Bernal & Cárrega, first, and G. Matti & Cia, later, between 1860 and 1862, it carried out the route between the city of Buenos Aires and Corumbá under the command of Berrizo, with stops in San Nicolás de lós Arroyos, Rosario, Paraná, Corrientes and Asunción. Later it became part of the ship chart of the Alto Paraguai Navigation Company, still in 1862. In 1863, under the command of Hipólito Betancour, it extended its service to the city of Cuiabá, about 660 kilometers from Corumbá, totaling a travel route of approximately three thousand kilometers. At the time of the imprisonment, the Brazilian ship was commanded by the retired first lieutenant of the Imperial Navy Corps, Manoel Luiz da Silva Souto. This was the second voyage under Souto's command, and he had scribe Antonio Fernando Póvoas and 42 other crew aboard; two Imperial Army officers and five Navy officers among them.

=== Border disputes ===
There were disagreements between Brazil and Paraguay, albeit peacefully, on the navigation of rivers and on what were the territorial limits of the two countries. For the former, the free navigation of the Paraguay River was of paramount importance, since it was the most practical means of reaching the remote province of Mato Grosso. From Rio de Janeiro to Cuiabá, sailing along the river, it took around 18 days; by land, although closer, it took months due to the many natural obstacles along the way. Paraguay was aware of this and used this situation to raise disputes on border issues, relating to the territory occupied by the Brazilians and located on the left bank of the Paraguay River, between the Apa and Branco rivers. Even with such disagreements, there had never been serious consequences or any conflict. Also, the Brazilian government had as a priority not to allow the Paraguayan union with the Argentine Confederation, which caused many problems due to its great political instability.

This period of peaceful disagreement between Brazilians and Paraguayans ended with the death of president Carlos Antonio López; consequently, his son, Francisco Solano López, assumed the presidency and soon expanded the country's foreign policy, initiating talks with Argentine general Justo José de Urquiza, who governed the province of Entre Ríos, and with the Blanco Party of Uruguay. Such talks, if successful, would facilitate Paraguay's access to the sea.

With the Uruguayan War underway and after the Brazilian ultimatum to Uruguay, in order for these countries to guarantee that they would quickly reach an agreement that would resolve Brazil's claims and guarantee the security of Brazilian citizens in Uruguay, which did not happen, in 1864 the Empire began a military intervention in the country. Upon learning of this, López immediately sent an ultimatum to Brazil, which was ignored. Despite this, it was not expected that Paraguay could take any action that would lead to war between the two nations; on the contrary, the correspondence exchanged by the Brazilian ministers accredited in Asunción and Buenos Aires, and others that arrived in Paraguay, written in the wake of the Brazilian invasion of Uruguay, did not allude to the change in the relationship between the two governments.

=== Uruguayan War ===
In July 1864, Antonio de las Carreras, leader of the Blanco Party in Uruguay, met with López in order to obtain guarantees from the Paraguayan government, who had a large and well-organized army, that it would be involved in the war in favor of Uruguay. López had previously promised that he would guarantee Uruguay's independence in the event of outside interference. Carreras returned to his country with the promise of the Paraguayan president that he would help them. As soon as he arrived, he assumed important positions in the government, such as that of Montevideo and three other Uruguayan departments, only to his disappointment, as the promised Paraguayan help never arrived, and was limited to a protest note with the Argentine government on 30 August. Carreras, however, did not give up on getting some help from Solano López and, with the support of José Vasquez Sagastume, the Uruguayan minister residing in Asunción, tried to persuade him to take some hostile attitude, employing his army in actions that diverted Brazil's attention in Uruguay.

The Uruguayans went to great lengths to encourage López to provoke an incident, regardless of how, as long as the Paraguayans acted in a hostile manner to Brazil. According to Charles Ames Washburn, "Sagastume knew the weaknesses of López", who liked to be praised, and with this in mind he did not save exaggerated praise about López, stating that since he was a child he had already shown great talent in the military area, though his detractors argued his troops did not participate in any fighting and that he had never approached a battlefield. Sagastume also claimed that Paraguay had a powerful army, capable of launching a major offensive against Brazil to take many cities and territories, threatening to destroy the empire and leading emperor Pedro II to agree to peace terms that were convenient for him.

Solano López knew of the revolution that monitor ships and ironclads were in the American Civil War, and that Brazil and Argentina did not have such vessels. He also stated that he was working to acquire these vessels, and that he would ask his country's Congress for authorization to take out a large loan in order to negotiate the acquisition of these ships in Europe. In Washburn's words, once obtained, López imagined that he would have a clear path to attack Buenos Aires and Montevideo, and from there attack Rio de Janeiro and dictate the terms of Pedro II's surrender. The Uruguayan War got in the way of his plans, as he was not yet ready to get involved in a war; he had not ordered the ships because he had not yet taken out the loan, in addition to not having strengthened some defensive positions on the Paraguay River, such as the Fortress of Humaitá, and not having received large amounts of armaments that he had ordered.

The Uruguayan government, impatient with Paraguay's delay in acting, sent several agents to that country on an unofficial mission to urge immediate action and inform whether López was really preparing for war. Among them was a colonel named Laguna and agent Juan J. Soto, who were intimate with López and corresponded with him. Soto informed the Uruguayan government that López's attitudes were uncertain and indecisive.

=== Espionage ===
News of the Brazilian invasion of Uruguay, on 14 October 1864, reached Asunción in a few days. No action on the part of the Paraguayans happened immediately, and nothing suggested any interruption in their relationship with Brazil. On 9 November, the Brazilian steamer Marquês de Olinda was sailing on the Paraguay River, approaching the Fortress of Humaitá, on its regular voyage to the province of Mato Grosso. Unaware of any danger, and after the usual greetings to the fort, the Brazilian ship resumed its journey to Corumbá. On 11 November, Marquês de Olinda docked at the port of Asunción and began routine procedures, such as the rapid distribution of mail and the replacement of coal. At thirteen o'clock of the same day, the steamer resumed its journey to Mato Grosso.

On that day, Solano López was in the Cerro León encampment, about 56 kilometers from Asunción. He had been informed, in a letter delivered that morning, that the Marquês de Olinda, escorted by the war frigate Amazonas, was transporting the new president of the province of Mato Grosso, along with a military engineer, and many weapons and a valuable cargo. Soto, who had given López the letter, advised him to take possession of both ships. Amazonas, however, did not participate in this voyage, with the Marquês de Olinda sailing alone. The letter that López received had been sent from the Marquês de Olinda itself.

== The capture ==
After receiving the information, López sent the capture order, still in the early afternoon of the same day, by train, for the steamer Tacuarí to depart in search of the Brazilian ship, with instructions to capture it by force, if necessary. Despite the Paraguayan steamer being the fastest ship docked in the port of Asunción, it did not have the fuel to immediately carry out the order. Several hours were lost in the coal supply and towards the end, one of the boiler tubes suffered a failure. The ship only left in the early evening.

It was around 6:30 am on 12 November, when Marquês de Olinda's crew spotted a column of smoke that was gradually increasing and which they soon identified as the Paraguayan steamer heading in towards them. Tacuarí fired a warning shot for the Brazilian steamer to stop and when it passed it, it stayed ahead of the bow. Because it was faster, the Paraguayan ship and a few other armed boats caught up with Marquês de Olinda before it had crossed the Paraguayan border, in the Potrero-Poña region, south of Concepción, 66 kilometers from Asunción. After stopping Marquês de Olinda, a longboat from the Tacuarí took a letter to commander Manoel Luiz da Silva Souto ordering "the immediate return to Asunción and, in case of resistance, the captured ship be put under the fire of the corsair”. The Brazilian commander analyzed the document and decided to meet with the crew to explain what was happening. When analyzing the situation, it became clear that resistance was impossible and a protest letter was drafted that was sent to the Paraguayan commander, but was refused. The captain of Tacuarí said that he was not authorized to receive papers and that the Brazilian captain should carry out the orders to the Paraguayan government. The Brazilian vessel turned around and went down the river escorted by the Paraguayan vessel, docking on the port of Asunción on the night of that same day.

The next day, two longboats moored to the ship and an officer with some sentries went aboard and looked for commander Souto to inform that "they would keep them company". The Paraguayan sentries were scattered around the ship. On the 17th, a commission created by the Ministry of War and Navy of Paraguay, consisting of colonel Francisco Wisner de Morgenstern, José Falcón and another member of unregistered name, boarded the ship to examine the correspondence that the vessel was carrying, with the justification that they should know what was convenient for the Paraguayan public cause. In fact, the commission searched the luggage of all crew members and passengers, even rummaging through the coal depot, which caused some animosity between a Brazilian officer and Falcón. 400 million réis belonging to the Empire of Brazil and 8 million réis from the shipping company to which Marquês de Olinda belonged, in addition to some of the passengers' belongings, were confiscated. When analyzing what had been searched, Solano López would have been disappointed, as the ship did not carry weapons or valuable cargo, according to his agent's report. And the money confiscated lost its value when news of the confiscation reached Brazil. No one on board was allowed to communicate with anyone on land. Upon becoming aware of what had happened, the Brazilian minister based in Asunción, asked the Paraguayan government for explanation, for which he received the answer along with a note from Paraguayan diplomat José Berges, who formally declared that diplomatic relations between the two countries had ceased, due to the fact that Brazil had invaded Uruguay.

Brazilian officers began to be disembarked for interrogation. After that they were taken to a Paraguayan steamer to be interrogated again. Brazilians were asked if they didn't know about the 30 August protest of that year; if they did not know about the entry of Brazilian military forces in Uruguay; whether they had any particular instructions from the Brazilian government; and, finally, how dare they pass through Paraguayan waters knowing these things; and if they did not fear the war that was being declared on Brazil. The Brazilian answer was almost always the same: it was known that Brazil had invaded Uruguay from the news in the newspapers; that they were going to take up their new offices, and that they had no idea that there was a declaration of war. Among the crew were the newly appointed president of the Mato Grosso province, Frederico Carneiro de Campos and a military engineer. All were held prisoner and the overwhelming majority of Brazilian officers would never return to Brazil. At first, only engineers from other countries and the Brazilian legation were released. After imprisoning the ship, the Paraguayans sent the prisoners to tents set up near the Paraguay River and then sent them to the interior of the country, most of whom died of torture and starvation. Still, some survived.

In order to give an appearance of regularity to the capture of the Marquês de Olinda, an Admiralty Court was improvised to decide on the legality of the action. The works of the court were never published, and, according to Washburn, its members had no idea what an Admiralty Court was. The accused party did not have any legal representative, whether officer, crew or passenger. To the public, it was only published in the newspaper El Semanario that the seizure of the steamer had been judged by a court, which condemned the vessel as a war prize.

The court, presided over by Andrés Gill, proved to be a complete farce. Under Paraguayan law, any and all cases were subject to the president's appeal and the trial was only to give regularity to López's orders. All the steps taken, in the case of the capture of the Brazilian steamer, followed the direct orders of López and if any member of the court protested about the legality of the process, he would suffer consequences. In Washburn's view, the imprisonment of the ship and its crew violated all the norms of modern warfare; López insisted he had the right to do so.

== Consequences ==
=== Paraguayan War ===
On 30 August 1864, the Paraguayan government sent an ultimatum to the Empire of Brazil: “(...) the government of the Republic of Paraguay will consider any occupation of the Oriental Territory [Uruguay] by imperial forces... as an attack on the balance of the Platine States, which is of interest to the Republic of Paraguay as a guarantee of its security, peace and prosperity, and with the most solemn protest against such act, exempting itself from responsibility for events subsequent to the present declaration”. This protest only reached Brazil on 19 October, and from then on, preparations for the defense of Mato Grosso began. The ultimatum was reaffirmed in notes sent on 3 and 4 September, triggering the Paraguayan war.

Upon imprisoning Marquês de Olinda, Solano López concluded that Brazil was determined to wage war against his country. A factor, which in his opinion, corroborated his reasoning, was the knowledge that the Brazilian war frigate Amazonas and two other Brazilian were navigating the Paraguay River towards Mato Grosso, transporting weapons, characterizing a form of war preparations. However, that was not the case. For López, war was inevitable, as a result, he began preparations for the invasion of Mato Grosso on 15 November, and this should take place as soon as possible. And so it happened.

López planned the invasion of Mato Grosso in two columns. One of them, under the command of Vincente Barrios, would advance along the Paraguay River, possibly heading towards Cuiabá. This column had 12 rifled artillery pieces, congreve rockets and more than a thousand cavalry. The expedition was joined by the steamers Tacuarí, Paraguarí, Igurey, Río Blanco and Ypora; the schooners Independencia and Aquidabán, the patache Rosario and the boats Humaita and Cerro León. Later, they were joined by Salto de Guaíra, Rio Apa and the Marquês de Olinda itself. The total force numbere 3,200 men. The second column was commanded by colonel Isidoro Resquín and was made up of 2,500 cavalry and infantrymen. It advanced through Bela Vista, Nioaque, Miranda, Coxim and from there, possibly, to Cuiabá, which would be attacked by the two converging columns. The invasion of Mato Grosso began on 27 December 1864. From then on, the largest interstate armed conflict in South America began, the Paraguayan War, which would last for more than five years, until Solano López was killed in the Battle of Cerro Corá in 1870.

=== Ship's fate ===
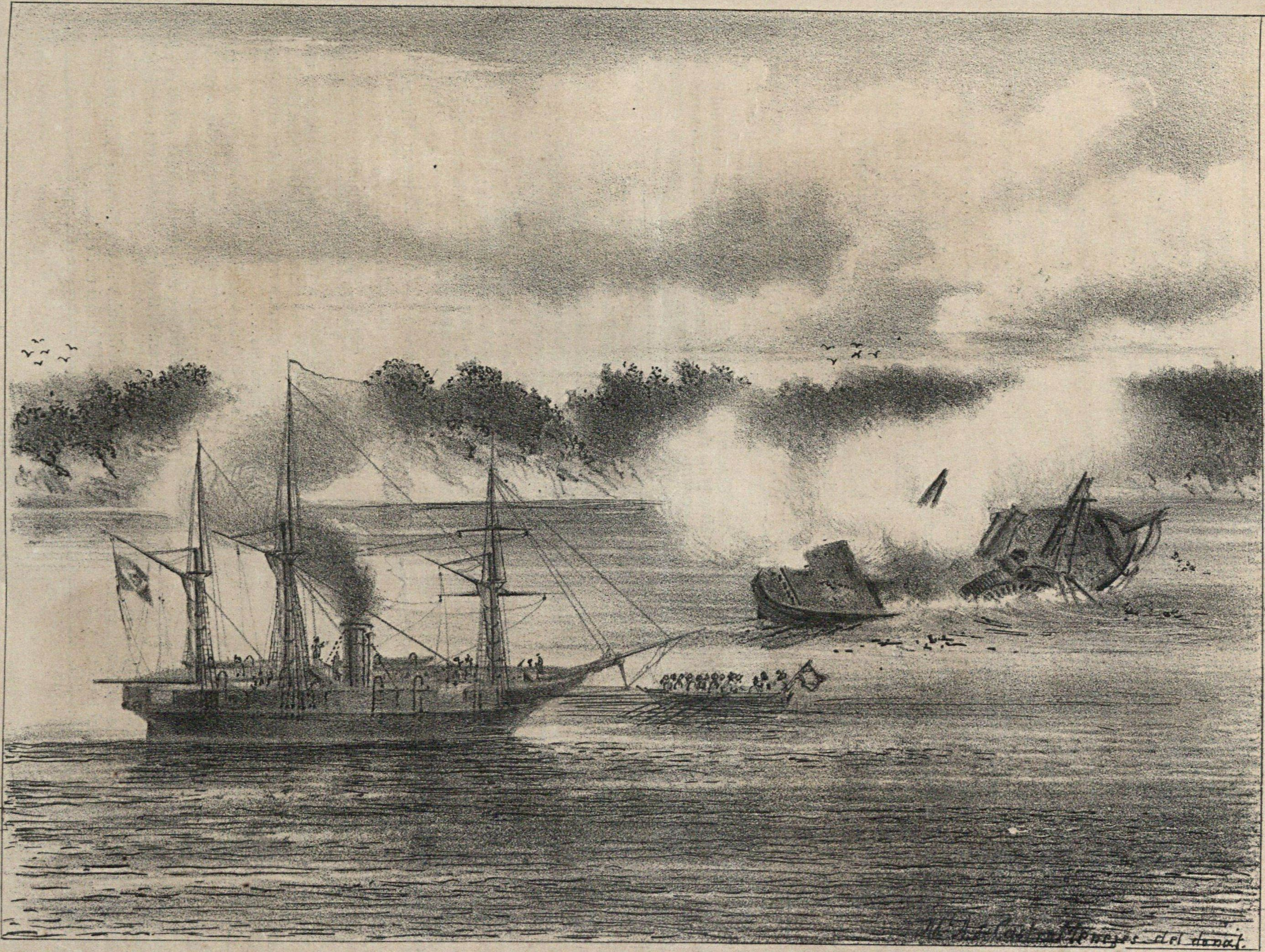
Marquês de Olinda on fire after the Battle of Riachuelo (Semana Illustrada, no. 248, 1865)

After the ship's capture, the Paraguayans converted it into a warship, arming it with 8 cannons. On 11 June 1865, the Marquês de Olinda, under the command of lieutenant Wenceslao Robles, was one of the ships that attacked Brazilian ships in the Battle of Riachuelo. At the time, the Brazilian ship Parnaíba was boarded by the Paraguayans aboard three ships, as well as the Jequitinhonha. A hand-to-hand combat began on the deck of Parnaíba, after which Marquês de Olinda came to aid and boarded Parnaíba with hundreds of experienced Paraguayan soldiers, armed with sabers, hatchets and revolvers.

The Paraguayans achieved initial success, after an hour of fighting, taking the deck up to the mainmast. The artillerymen, protected by their own artillery pieces, fired at them incessantly, supported by Mearim and Belmonte. At the first shot of the ships, the boarders abandoned their companions who had climbed the Parnaíba. Trying to help his companions, Marquês de Olinda approached the combat, but was prevented by Amazonas, which was previously firing at the coastal artillery batteries of José María Bruguez, who charged directly against the ship, ramming it and causing it to capsize, thus ending its participation in the war.

The following day, the ship had been spotted and boarded by Araguari, under the command of lieutenant Antônio Luís von Hoonholtz. On board there were 55 crew members alive, in addition to a British machinist and his commander, lieutenant Ezequiel Robles, brother of Wenceslao Robles, the general commanding the troops in Corrientes, mortally wounded. Aided by a Paraguayan officer, Robles ceremonially handed over his sword to lieutenant Hoonholtz, dying of his wounds on 14 June. Marquês de Olinda's crew was taken on the same date, and the ship was dismantled and set on fire on 17 June.
