= Battle of Paso de Cuevas =

- Part of the Corrientes campaign
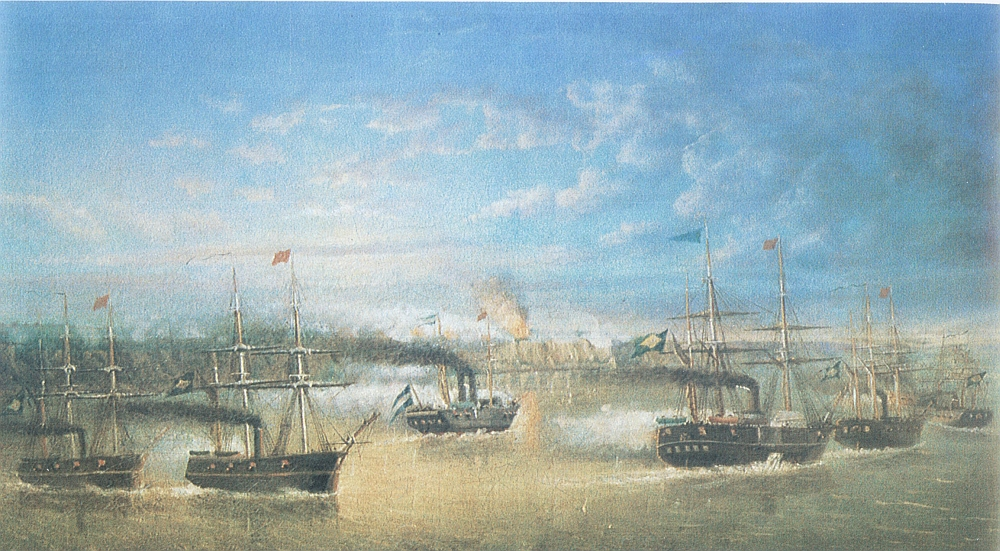
- Battle of Cuevas, 12 August 1865 (José Murature).
Date	12 August 1865
Location	Corrientes Province, Argentina
Result	Allied victory.: Warships successfully pass.

Belligerents
Empire of Brazil; Argentina	Paraguay

Commanders and leaders
Francisco M. Barroso; José Murature	José María Bruguez

Strength
12 ships with 60 cannons: 3 frigates 3 corvettes 5 gunboats 1 transport 1 gunboat	3,000 soldiers 34 cannons

Casualties and losses
24 killed 42 wounded	Unknown

The Battle of Paso de Cuevas was fought on 12 August 1865 during the Paraguayan invasion of the Argentine province of Corrientes.

Following losses after the Battle of Riachuelo, and running the gauntlet set up by José María Bruguez at Bella Vista in the Battle of Paso de Mercedes the day before, the allied fleet advanced down the River Paraná, not wanting to be cut off from its supply base. However, the pass at Cuevas was once again manned by 3,000 of Bruguez's men with 34 guns. Barroso suffered 24 dead and 42 wounded.

This was the last operation of naval combat of the Argentine Navy at war with foreign nations prior to the Falklands War.

== Bibliography ==
- Garcia, Rodolfo (2012). Obras do Barão do Rio Branco. Vol. VI: efemérides brasileiras. Brasília: Fundação Alexandre de Gusmão. ISBN 978-85-7631-357-1.
- Hooker, Terry D. (2008). The Paraguayan War. Nottingham, United Kingdom: Foundry Books. ISBN 978-1901543155.
- Jaques, Tony (2007). Dictionary of Battles and Sieges: P-Z. Westport: Greenwood Press. ISBN 978-0-313-33536-5.

== Gallery ==
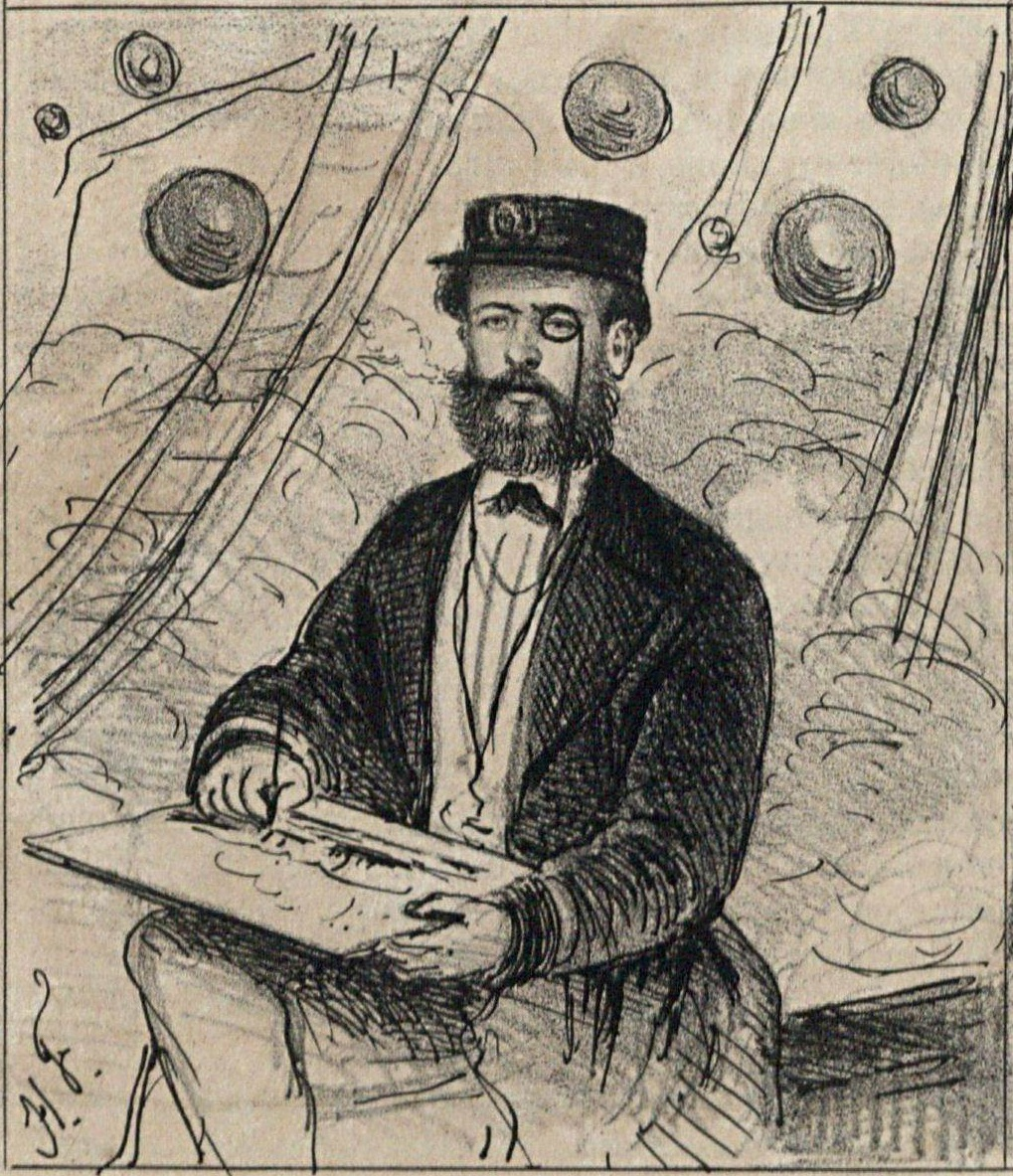
A. L. von Hoonholtz, commander of the Brazilian gunboat Araguary, passing the battery of Cuevas and drawing it.

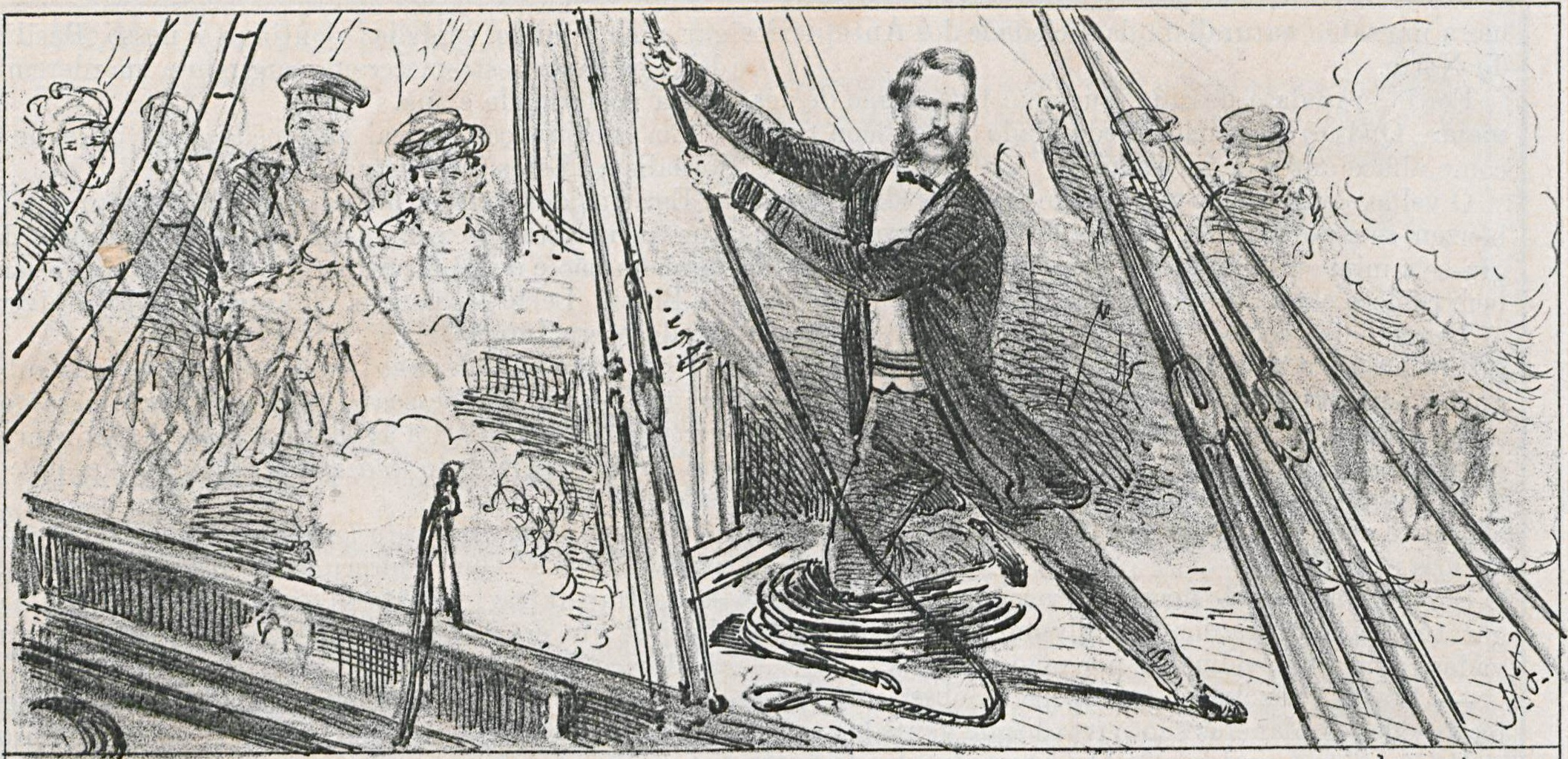
The 1st Lt. Fortunato Foster Vidal, secretary of the Captain at sea Alvim, seeing the helm of the corvette Beberibe unusable by a bullet of the Paraguayan batteries, run to repair the damage; and under live fire, gives direction to the ship.

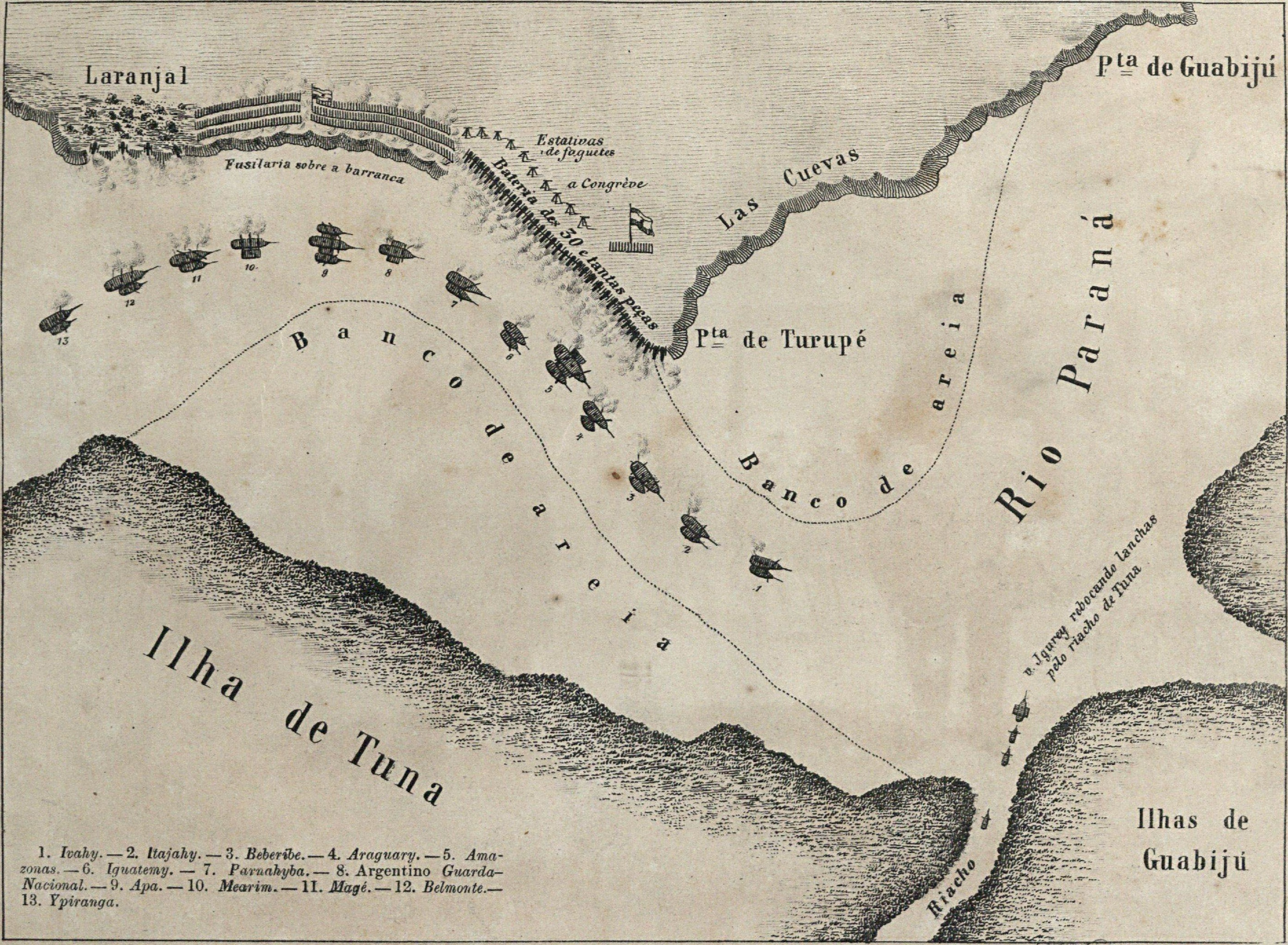
Plan of the passage of the Brazilian Squadron by the ravines of Turupi and Guabijú, on 12 August 1865. Raised and drawn by A. L. von Hoonholtz (Suplemento da Semana Illustrada n.º 248, 1865).
