= Empedrado, Corrientes =

Empedrado Empedrádo (Guarani)
- City
- Location of Empedrado in Argentina
- Coordinates: 27°56′S 58°47′W
- Country: Argentina
- Province: Corrientes
- Department: Empedrado
- Elevation: 56 m (184 ft)

Population (2010)
  - Total: 13,245
- Time zone: UTC−3 (ART)
- CPA base: W3418
- Dialing code: +54 3783

Empedrado (Guarani: Empedrádo) is a city in Corrientes Province, Argentina.

It is the capital of the Empedrado Department.

== See also ==
- Empedrado (disambiguation)
