= Battle of Paso de Mercedes =

Event in the Paraguay War

- Part of the Corrientes campaign
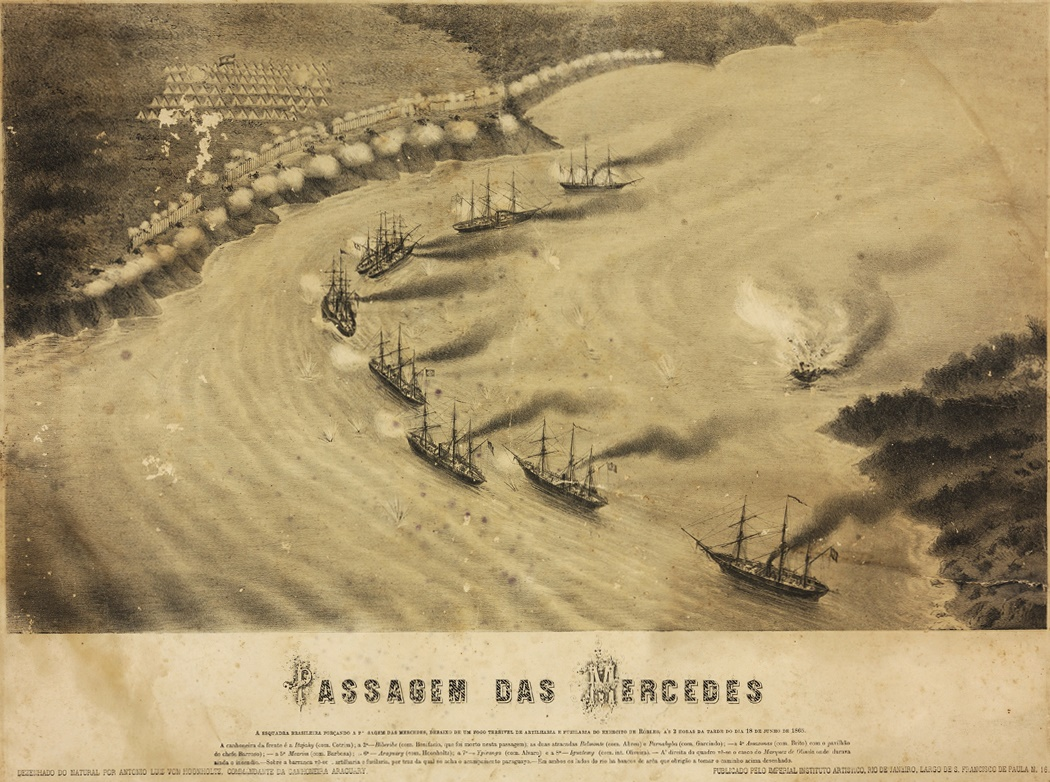
Date	August 11, 1865; 161 years ago
Location	Corrientes Province, Argentina
Result	Brazilian victory: Warships successfully pass

Belligerents
Empire of Brazil	Paraguay

Commanders and leaders
Francisco M. Barroso	José María Bruguez

Strength
12 ships with 60 cannons	3,000 soldiers with 34 cannons

Casualties and losses
20 killed and injured	2 killed and 8 injured

The Battle of Paso de Mercedes was fought on 11 August 1865 during the Paraguayan invasion of the Argentine province of Corrientes.

The battle took place at Bella Vista along the Paraná River, west of Mercedes.

== History ==
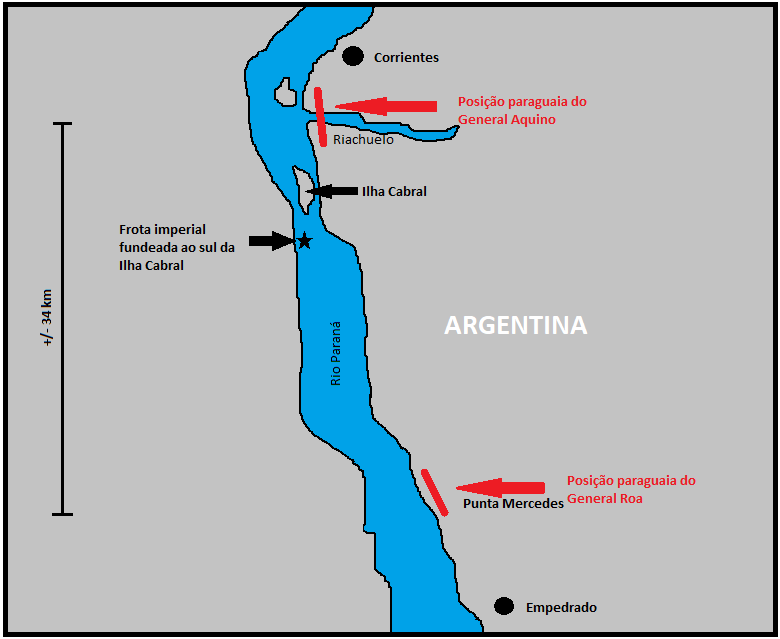
This graph shows the Paraguayan plan to ambush the Brazilian imperial fleet at the Passage of the Mercedes on June 18, 1865.

Following the Battle of Riachuelo, José María Bruguez, Paraguayan commander, moved his men and Major Aquino's batteries to Punta Mercedes, about 15 miles north of Stonehouse ( Corrientes), to kilometer 1157 of the Paraná River. in attempt to cut the fleet from their supply base downstream. He chose this position on 15 meter cliffs, as it afforded the guns a good angle on the passing fleet, from which he fired canister and grapeshot.

The Brazilian Navy fleet consisted of the Amazonas frigate (flagship), Apa, 6 gunboats: Ipiranga, Beberibe, Mearim, Araguary, Ivahy and Iguatemy; corvettes: Parnahyba, Belmonte, Maje, and Itajaí. Once past the gauntlet, Barroso continued another 9.6 km downstream, where he stopped for the night. Bruguez meanwhile, backed up batteries and headed once again down river to Punta Cuevas, 25 km south of the town of Bella Vista, where he repeated his action against the fleet in the Battle of Paso de Cuevas.
