= Battle of Boquerón (1866) =

Part of the Paraguayan War

- Part of the Humaitá campaign
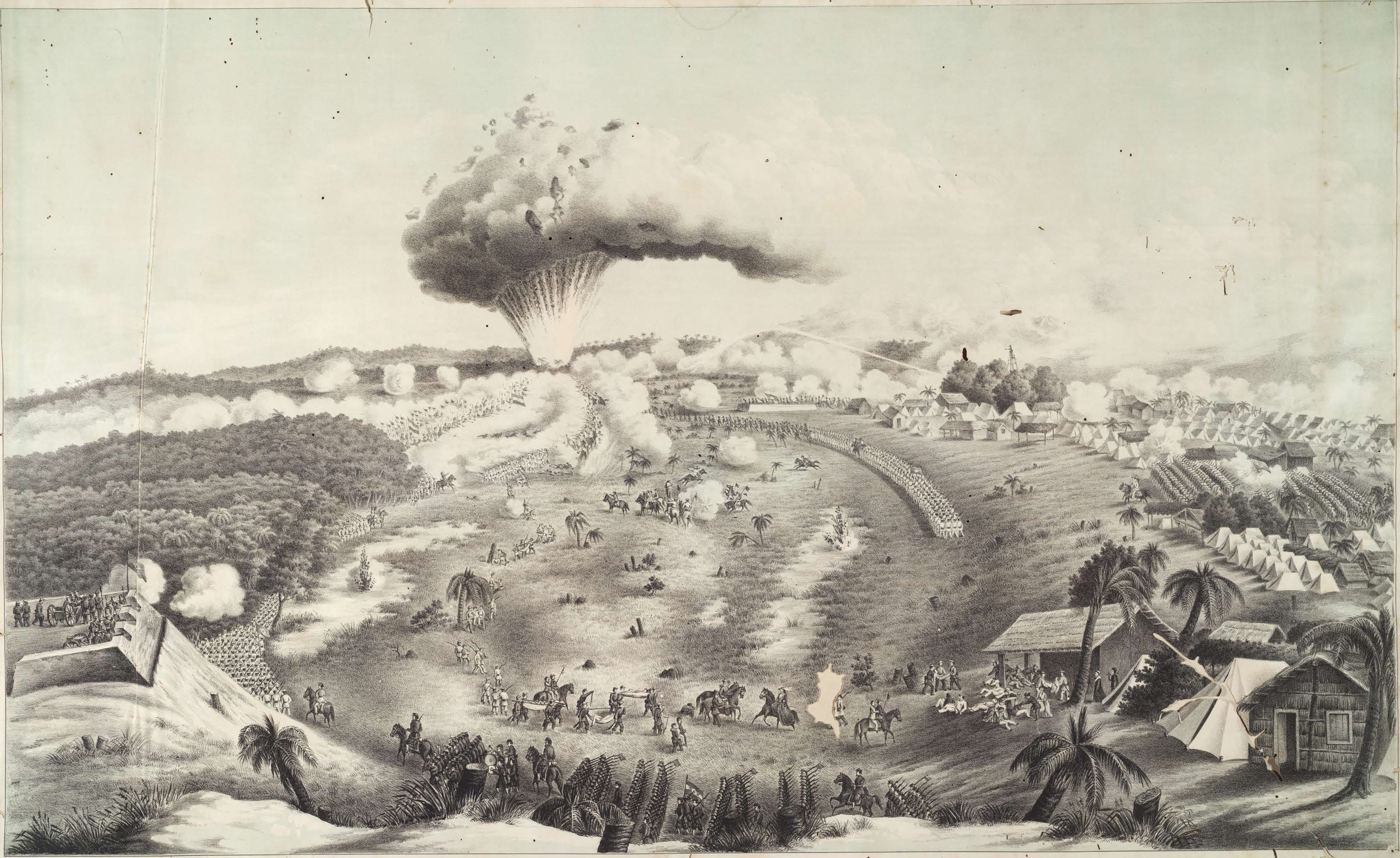
- Battle of Boquerón
Date	16 July 1866
Location	Ñeembucú, Paraguay
Result	Paraguayan victory

Belligerents
Empire of Brazil; Argentina; Uruguay	Paraguay

Commanders and leaders
(Empire of Brazil) Guilherme de Sousa; (Empire of Brazil) José Luís Barreto; (Empire of Brazil) Vitorino Carneiro; (Uruguay) León de Pallejas †	(Paraguay) Elizardo Aquino †; (Paraguay) José María Bruguez

Strength
3,000	3 infantry battalions

Casualties and losses
1,954: 285 killed 1,631 wounded 38 missing	2,000 casualties

The Battle of Boquerón was fought on 16 July 1866 and the Battle of Sauce on 18 July 1866, between an allied force of Uruguayans, Brazilians, and Argentines on one side and Paraguay on the other in the Paraguayan War. The Spanish-born Uruguayan officer León de Pallejas (1816–1866) and the Paraguayan officer Elizardo Aquino were killed in the battle.

== Background ==
Following the First Battle of Tuyutí after the Allied forces invaded Paraguay, president Francisco Solano López tried enticing the Allies into attacking his fortifications at Curupayty and Curuzú along the Paraguay River. By June 1866, López had 20,000 soldiers along the front.

== Battle of Yataytí Corá ==
On 11 July, 2,500 Paraguayans under the command of general José E. Díaz, attacked the positions outside the main Argentine camp perimeter. The attack was stopped by dusk due to a grass fire set by the Congreve rockets, but soon resumed. By 2100, the fighting ended after the Paraguayans suffered 400 casualties and 30 wounded men captured. The Argentines lost 30 men killed, 177 wounded and 51 missing

== Battle of Boquerón ==
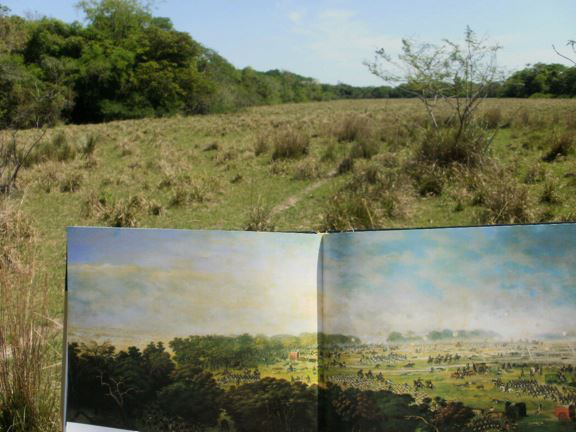
The site of the battlefield in 2013 with (inset) Cándido López's painting of the encounter

López had dug two trenches during the night of 13 July, from which he planned on having snipers and artillery fire into the Brazilian left flank. Brazilian general Guilherme de Sousa led 3,000 men from the 4th Brazilian Division in an attack on the southern trench at 0500 on 16 July, supported by three Brazilian cavalry regiments. The Paraguayans were led by colonel Elizardo Aquino who was mortally wounded after 16 hours of fighting and four counter-attacks. The Paraguayans suffered 2,000 casualties in the loss of the southern trench, while the Brazilians had 282 men killed, 1,579 wounded and 38 missing, and the Argentines lost 3 killed and 52 wounded

== Battle of Sauce ==
The Brazilians attacked again on 18 July, the flanking movement by general José Luís Mena Barreto and a frontal assault by general Vitorino José Carneiro Monteiro. General Flores had general Sousa replace Monteiro when he was wounded. The allies lost colonels Palleja, Aguero, and Martínez. The Brazilians had 630 killed, 2,938 wounded, and 54 missing, the Argentines had 201 killed, 421 wounded, the Uruguayans had 250 casualties, while the Paraguayans had 2,500 casualties.

== Aftermath ==
The Battle of Curuzú was soon to follow.

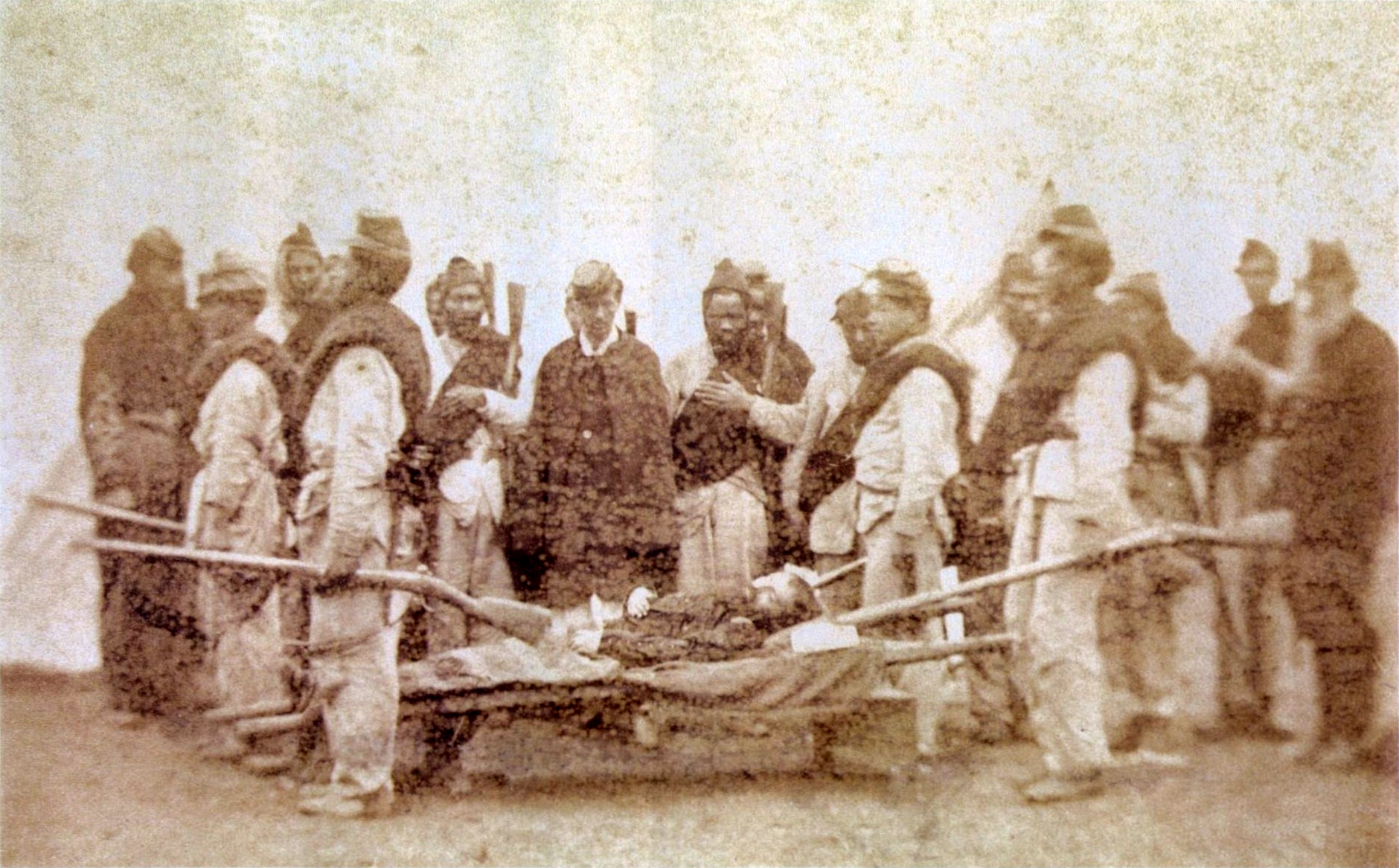
Uruguayan soldiers at the funeral of colonel León de Pallejas, killed in action at the Battle of Boquerón

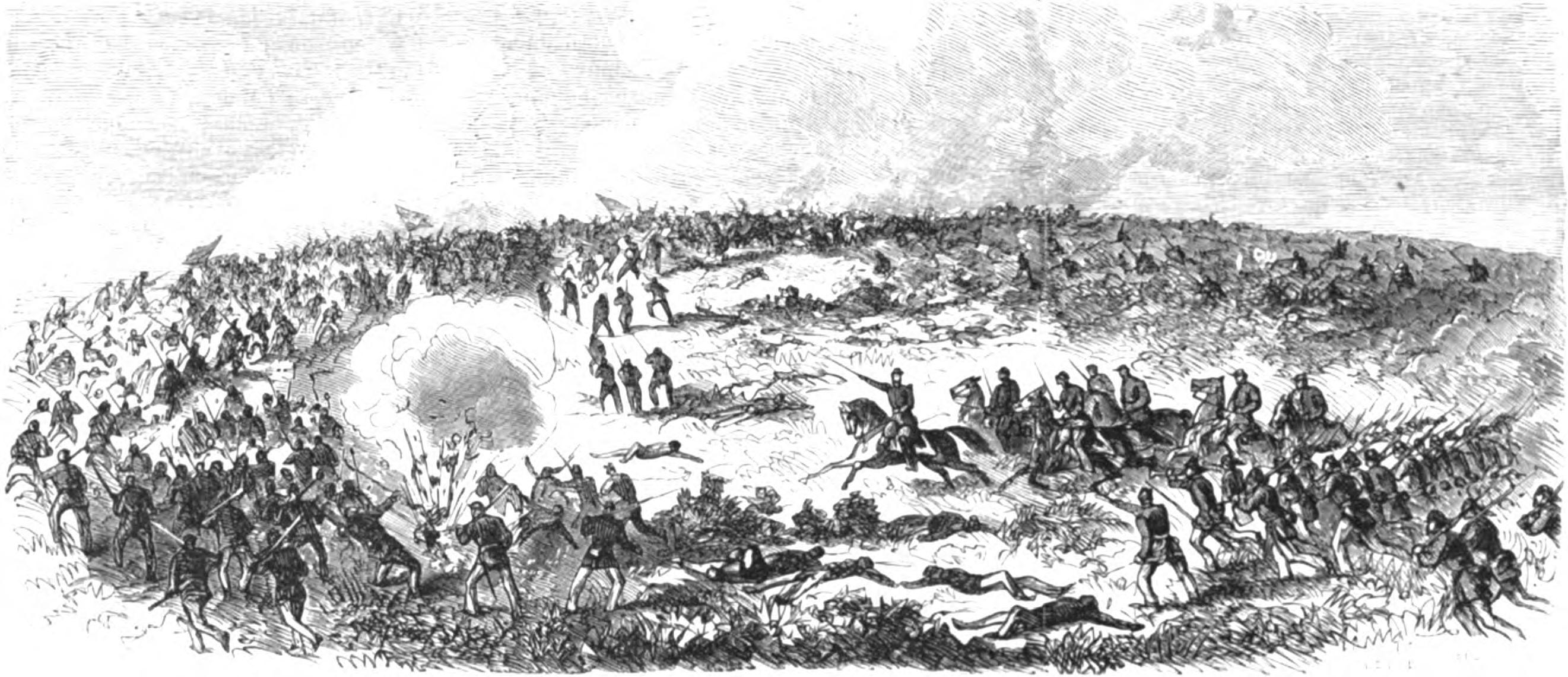
Charge of the 7th Brazilian Brigade, colonel Paranhos; wrongful removal of Paraguayan positions

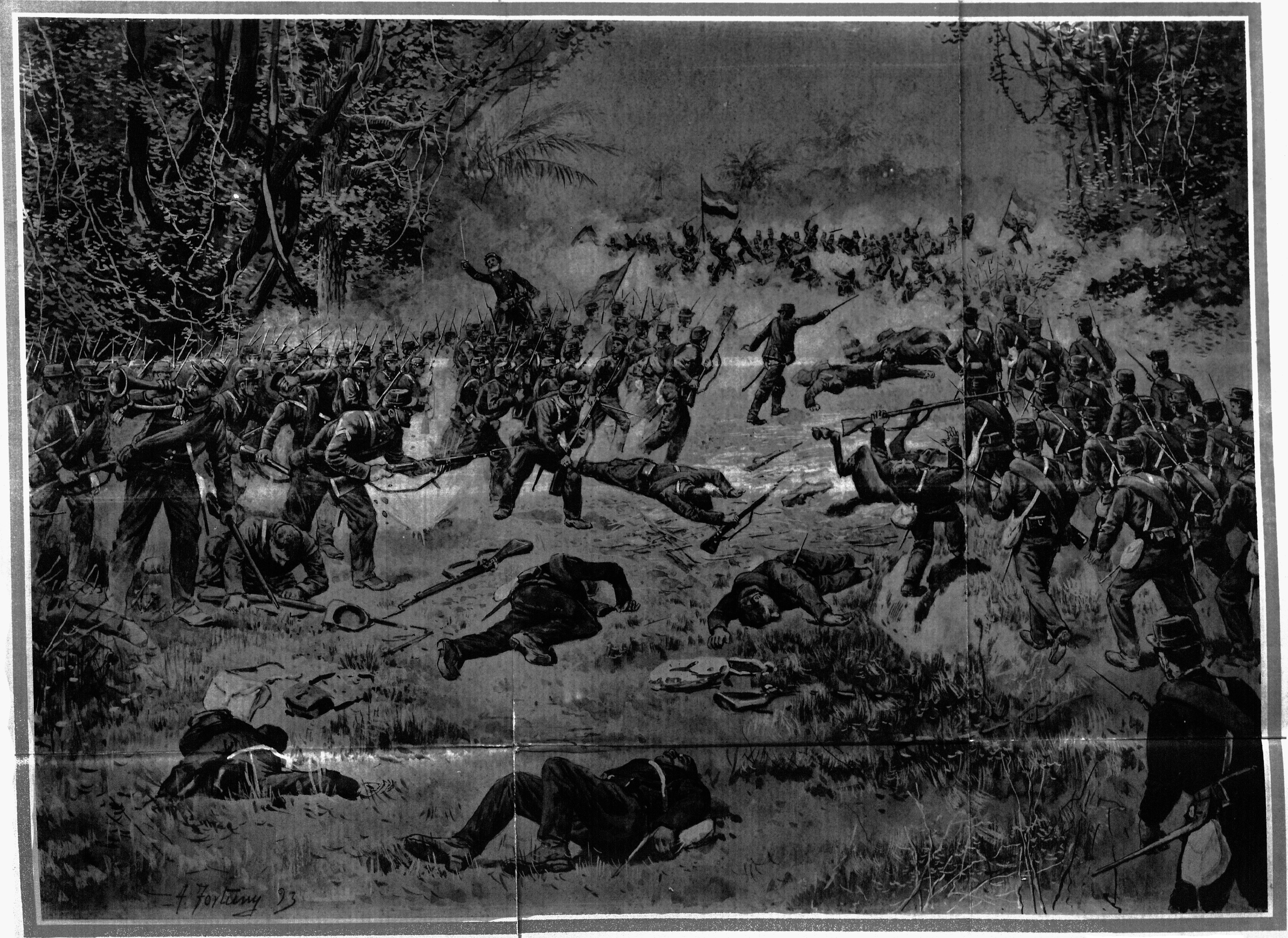
Attack of the 3rd Division of the 2nd Army Corps of Argentina, under the command of colonel Don Cesáreo Dominguez, on the Paraguayan trench of Boquerón de Piris (Battle of "Sauce" for the Paraguayans) – Picture of F. Fortuny

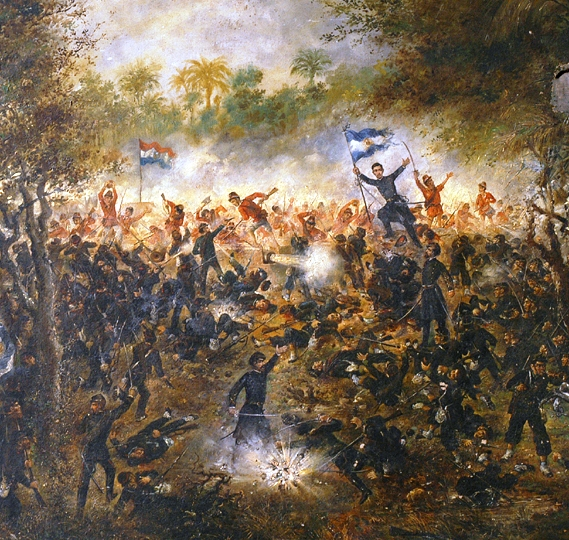
"The Battle of Boquerón, episode of the standard-bearer Dantas" by Modesto González
