= Empedrado Department =

Empedrado Department Departamento Empedrado (Spanish) Tetãvore Empedrádo (Guarani)
- Department
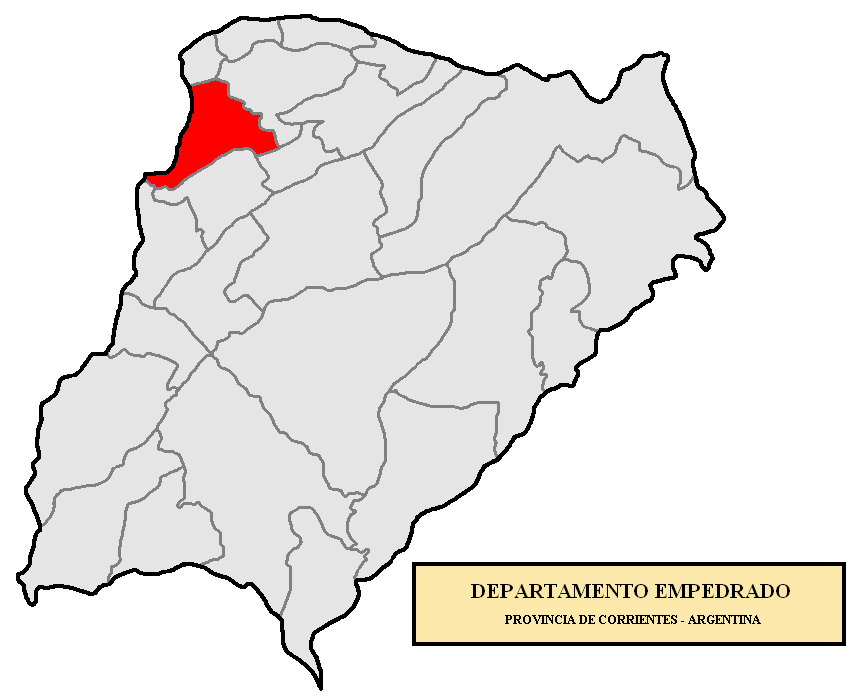
- location of Empedrado Department in Corrientes Province
- Coordinates: 27°56′S 58°47′W
- Country: Argentina
- Seat: Empedrado

Area
  - Total: 1,958 km^{2} (756 sq mi)

Population (2001 census [INDEC])
  - Total: 14,721
  - Density: 7.518/km^{2} (19.47/sq mi)
- Postal Code: W3418
- Area Code: 03783
- Website: web.archive.org/web/20080106185344/http://www.empedradocity.com.ar/

Empedrado Department is a department of Corrientes Province in Argentina.

The provincial subdivision has a population of about 14,721 inhabitants in an area of 1,958 km^{2} (756 sq mi), and its capital city is Empedrado, which is located around 1,030 km (640 mi) from Capital Federal.

== Settlements ==
- Empedrado
- El Sombrero
