= José María Bruguez =

Paraguayan general (1827–1868)

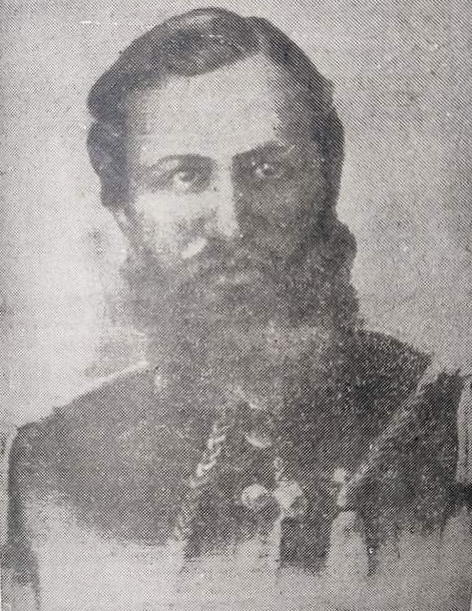
- Born: 1827; Asunción, Paraguay
- Died: 26 August 1868 (aged 40–41); San Fernando, Central Department, Paraguay
- Military career
- Allegiance: Paraguay
- Branch: Paraguayan Army
- Service years: 1845 – 1868
- Rank: General de ejército
- Conflicts: List: Paraguayan War; Mato Grosso campaign; Capture of the steamer Marquês de Olinda; Corrientes campaign; Battle of Riachuelo; Battle of Paso de Mercedes; Battle of Paso de Cuevas; Humaitá campaign; Battle of Estero Bellaco; Battle of Tuyutí; Battle of Boquerón; Second Battle of Tuyutí; Pikysyry campaign; 1868 San Fernando massacre (executed)

José María Bruguez (1827 – 26 August 1868) was a Paraguayan general during the Paraguayan War. He was one of the most prominent Paraguayan generals of the war, being known for his artillery services during naval engagements of the war. He died during the 1868 San Fernando massacre after President Francisco Solano López accused Bruguez of conspiring against him.

== Early Military Career ==
Bruguez was born on 1827 at Asunción. He enlisted in the Paraguayan Army in 1845 and was assigned within the artillery regiments. He was promoted to Lieutenant from 1852 to 1854 as he was in professional military classes taught by João Carlos de Villagran Cabrita and was reported to be his best student. He was in charge of the railway systems within Paraguay and promoted to Major along with being assigned to the chief of the Central Station on 1862.

== Paraguayan War ==
Upon the outbreak of the Paraguayan War, Bruguez participated in the Capture of the steamer Marquês de Olinda, directly ramming his artillery batteries against the ship which caused it to capsize. He then participated in the Battle of Riachuelo and would harass the Imperial Brazilian Navy with his artillery, managing to kill 12 men. He was awarded the Commander of the National Order of Merit on 17 June 1865 for his services in the battle. He continued his service during the Corrientes campaign during the Battle of Paso de Mercedes where he attempted to block the Imperial Brazilian Navy from passing the Paraná River. After losing the battle, he attempted to prevent the Allied forces from cutting off Paraguayan supplies at the Battle of Paso de Cuevas.

Already a Colonel by 1866, he would participate in the battles of Estero Bellaco and Tuyutí, being promoted to General on 25 May. It was also reported that during the Battle of Purutué Bank, Bruguez killed his former teacher Villagran Cabrita with a grenade that was fired at him. After fighting in the battles of Boquerón and the Second Battle of Tuyutí, Bruguez was executed on 26 August 1868, during the 1868 San Fernando Massacre, by President Francisco Solano López along with several other officers who Solano López thought were planning to overthrow him.

== Legacy ==
The district of General José María Bruguez is named after him.
