= Pichilemu, Valparaíso =

Pichilemu Pichilemu de Empedrado
- Village
- Pichilemu
- Location within Chile
- Coordinates: 32.3825°S 71.1211°W
- Country: Chile
- Region: Valparaíso
- Province: Petorca
- Commune: La Ligua

Pichilemu is a Chilean village, located in the commune of La Ligua, in the Valparaíso Region. It is located in the surroundings of Fundo Pichilemo de Empedrado (also known as the Fundo Pichilemu), north of the Petorca River. Pichilemo de Empedrado was property of Emperatriz del Carmen Lara Retamal and Ramón Bravo Azócar (who died in 1987 due to cancer).
