= Battle of Perecué =

Part of the Paraguayan War

- Part of the Humaitá campaign
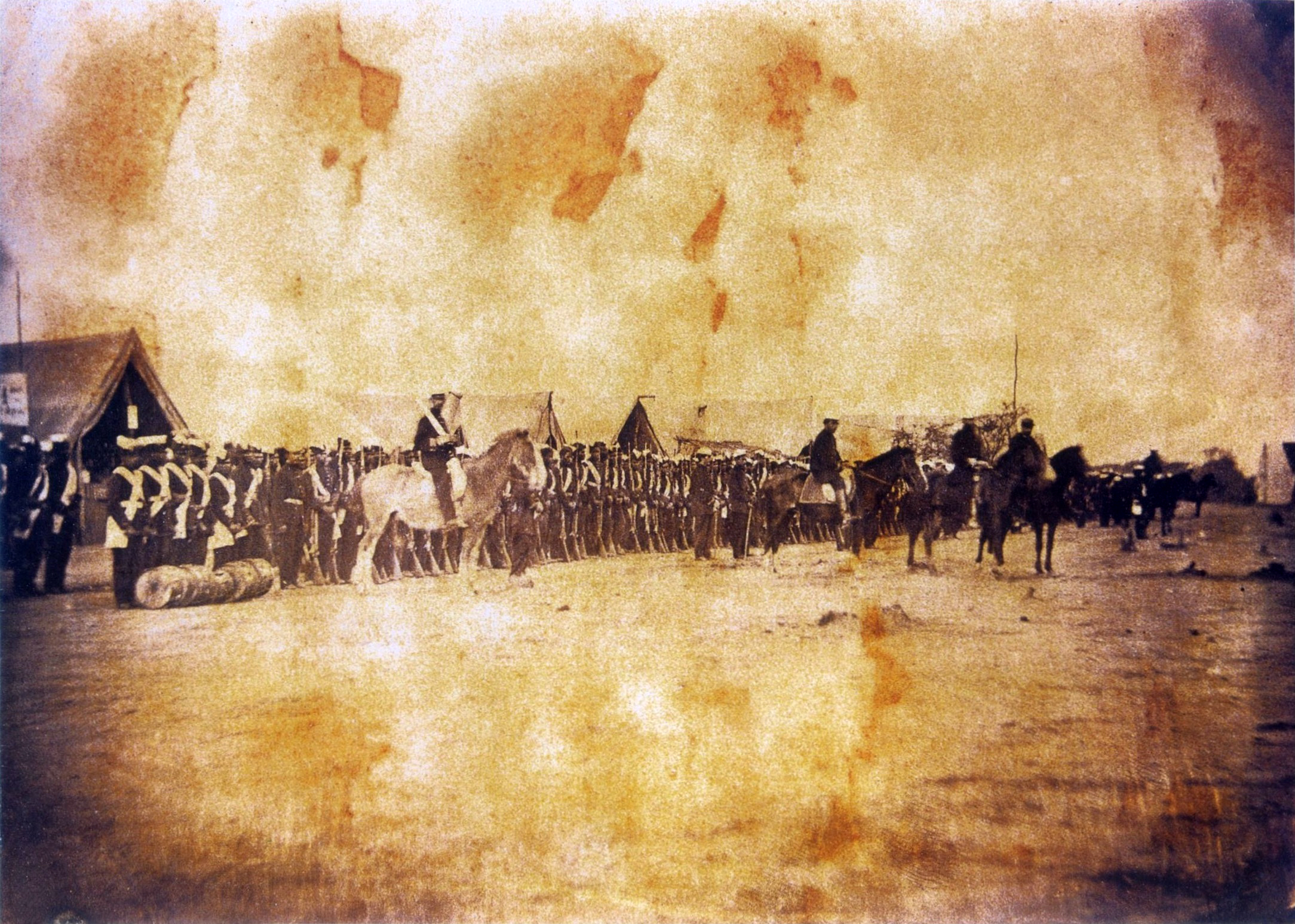
- Brazilian troops in Tayi during the Paraguayan War
Date	October 3, 1867
Location	Fortress of Humaitá, Paraguay
Result	Paraguayan victory

Belligerents
Empire of Brazil	Paraguay

Commanders and leaders
Marquess of Caxias	Bernardino Caballero; Saturnino Viveros

Strength
1,500 soldiers	800 soldiers

Casualties and losses
500 casualties	300 casualties

The Battle of Perecué, also known as Battle of Tayí Island, was an armed action that occurred during the Paraguayan War. Paraguayan general Bernardino Caballero's troops launched guerrilla-style raids on the Allied encampment in the Tayí area, near the Humaitá Fortress. The Marquis of Caxias, Luís Alves de Lima e Silva, who had replaced Bartolomé Mitre in the supreme command of allied troops, learned of the Paraguayan presence in the area and prepared a counterattack on his enemies, failing in this action that resulted in a pyrrhic victory of the Paraguayans.

== The Battle ==
On October 3, 1867, Bernardino Caballero left Humaitá with some 800 riders heading for San Solano, to launch himself by surprise over Brazilian forces, weakening the right flank of the allies. The Duke of Caxias understood the Paraguayan plan and was preparing a reaction.

In the vicinity of Tayí Island, there was an advanced Paraguayan group protected by a detachment led by captains José González and Pascual Urdapilleta. The Brazilian infantry launched themselves at them, thus starting the battle. The Paraguayans resisted, receiving reinforcements from Major Saturnino Viveros, who had stood out in the Battle of Pehuajó, also known as Corrales. Bernardino Caballero's cavalry, along with his officers Valois Rivarola and Antonio Olavarrieta, arrived at the rescue of the Paraguayan detachment, crushing the attackers. In the meantime, Caxias had already organized a force to attack Paraguayan cavalry. Caballero, seeing the Brazilian soldiers, about three cavalry regiments and two infantry, approaching his position dangerously, ordered Major Viveros to remain in the detachment, while he went with his riders to meet the enemies.

The Allies launched the first attack, but were repelled with a fierce saber-ridden cavalry charge. They tried a second attack, there the Paraguayans waited for them and were met with musket fire. Caballero saw the opportunity to counterattack and launched himself at the Brazilian vanguard, which fled his artillery. Caxias, irritated, sent three infantry regiments to reinforce his severely flogged men. The Paraguayans disorganized, but Bernardino Caballero, with the help of Rivarola and Olavarrieta, managed to rebuild his lines and launched a new counterattack. Caxias' troops this time fled for good.

Despite the victory, the Paraguayans abandoned the position, leaving only the González and Urdapilleta detachments with some reinforcements. Caxias, although bored, knew it was just a minor setback. He would have the opportunity, however, to take revenge at the Battle of Tatayibá, definitively defeating Bernardino Caballero's cavalry.
