= Military Obelisk of Brasilia =

Coordinates: 15°46′24″S 47°55′11″W

Military Obelisk of Brasília
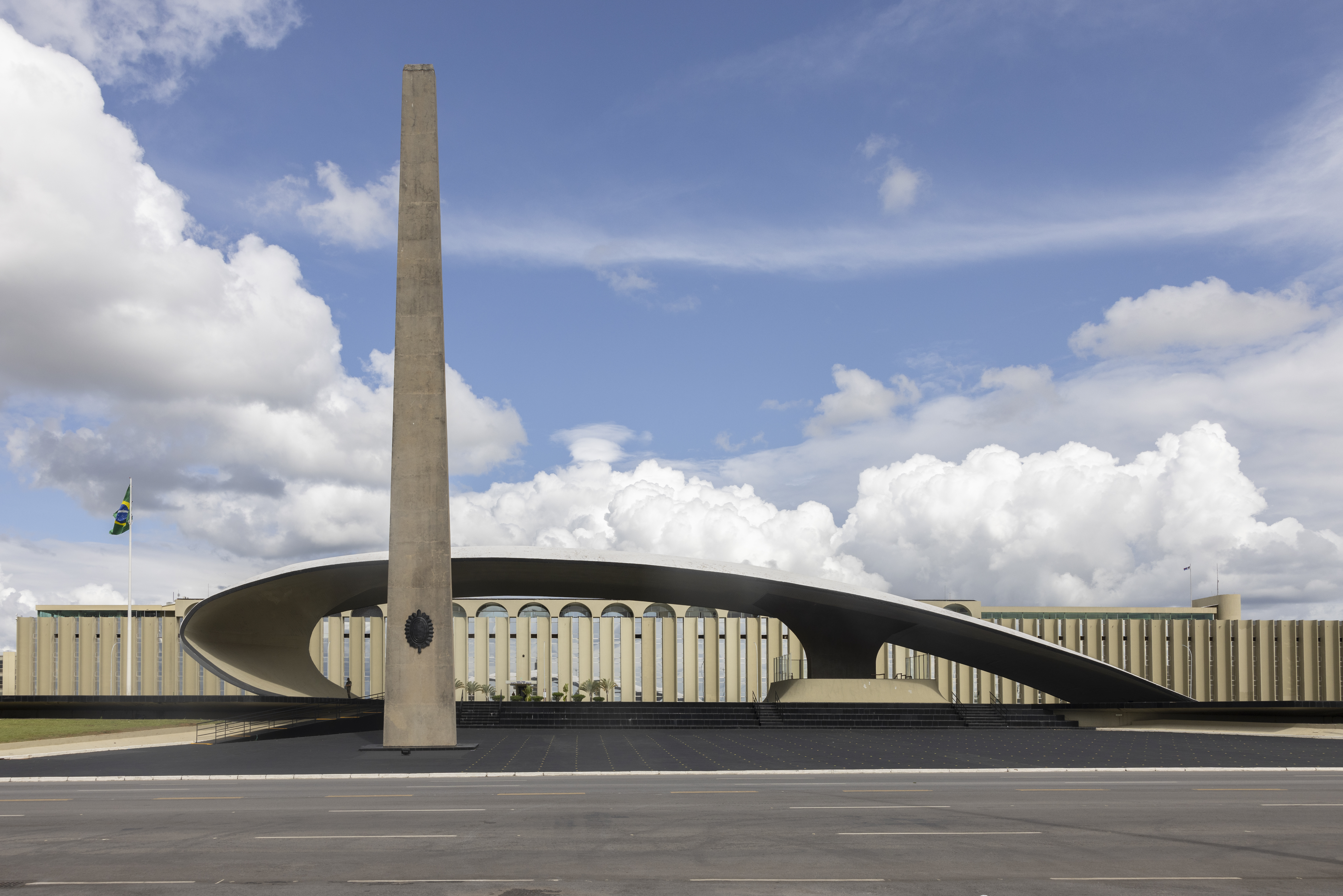
- Image of the obelisk in 2022.
- Location: Army Headquarters, Urban Military Sector, Brasília, DF
- Material: Concrete

The Military Obelisk of Brasília is a monument in Brazil erected at the Army Headquarters in front of the Concha Acústica in Brasília, the Federal District.

== Background and purpose of the monument ==
Oscar Niemeyer first incorporated an obelisk into one of his works when he participated in the competition organized by the Ministry of Education and Health to select a project for the National Athletic Center in Rio de Janeiro. Niemeyer's project was not built. In 1949, Niemeyer also designed the Monument to Ruy Barbosa in Rio de Janeiro, which was not constructed either. He later revisited the project, and the obelisk was finally constructed in 1967 in the new capital. The military named it the "Sword of Duque de Caxias." The monument was erected in Brasília to honor Luís Alves de Lima e Silva, Duke of Caxias, the patron of the Brazilian Army.

== Architecture ==
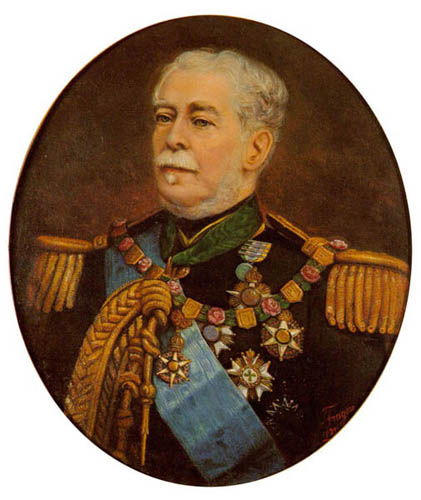
Duke of Caxias, the patron of the Brazilian Army

The architectural design of the monument dedicated to Duke of Caxias, known as the Acoustic Shell, includes an obelisk in the front. The combination of these two elements symbolically represents the hilt and blade of the patron of the Brazilian Army's sword. According to Vitruvios, a magazine specializing in architecture, the project was signed by Oscar Niemeyer and is characterized as follows:

The Army Headquarters, in the Urban Military Sector, the "Forte Caxias," is a late work. The grand and austere complex, with a sequence of parallel buildings, harks back to the fortifications of the first civilizations of antiquity, with their walls erected for the protection of palaces and temples. Between the headquarters and the street in front, there are: a large concrete cover tending toward an elliptical shape that forms a platform; and an obelisk – a reinterpretation of the Egyptian obelisks that were incorporated into temples at their entrances.

== See also ==
- Obelisk of Acre
- Obelisk of Bahia
- Obelisk of São Paulo

== Bibliography ==
- CARDOZO, Joaquim. Apud MATOSO MACEDO, Danilo; ARCADIO SOBREIRA, José Fabiano (Org.). Forma Estática – Forma Estética, Essays on Architecture and Engineering. Brasília: Câmara dos Deputados, Edições Câmara, 2009.
