= Battle of Laguna Cierva =

Battle in Paraguayan War

- Part of the Humaitá campaign
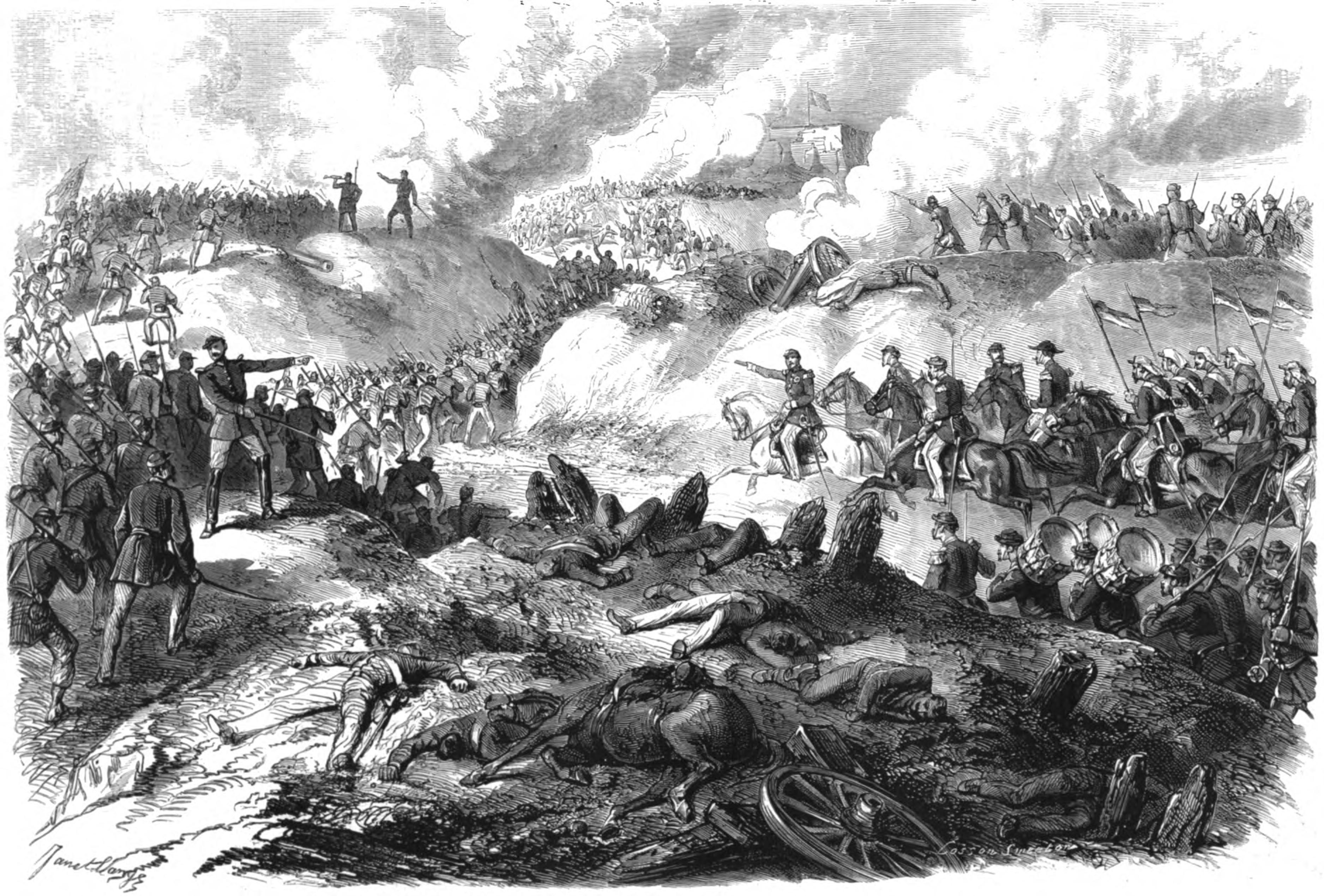
- Print depicting the assault of the Imperial Army on the Paraguayan fortress
Date	February 19, 1868
Location	Reduto Cierva, Paraguay
Result	Allied victory

Belligerents
Paraguay	Brazil; Argentina

Commanders and leaders
(Paraguay) Antonio Olavarrieta	Marquess of Caxias; (Empire of Brazil) Delfim de Carvalho

Strength
500 soldiers	800 soldiers 6 ironclads

Casualties and losses
300 casualties 9 guns	120 killed 456 wounded

The Battle of Laguna Cierva was a battle fought between Brazilian and Paraguayan imperial troops on February 19, 1868, during the Paraguayan War, in the region called Reducto Cierva known as Fuerte del Establecimiento. The site was on the right bank of the Paraguay River, north of the Fortress of Humaitá.

== Background and engagement ==
In early 1868, amidst the gruesome and slow Siege of Humaitá, Paraguay's president Francisco Solano López ordered a fort to be built some hundreds of meters to the north of the Fortress of Humaitá. It was garrisoned by 500 troops under major Antonio Olavarrieta, and had 9 guns. The British engineer George Thompson considered the fort to be useless. The Brazilians, however, believed it to be located on the shore of the Paraguay River, and that capturing it would mean having a base of operations on the river to the north of Humaitá; this was a misconception, however, owing to faulty reconnaissance work.

The fort was attacked by the allies in a joint river and land operation. Six ironclads were employed under the command of Delfim Carlos de Carvalho, who, under the Paraguayan fire, managed to break Humaitá's chain boom opening the way to the Paraguayan capital, Asunción, which they shelled. For this feat, Delfim was awarded by Emperor Pedro II with the title of Barão da Passagem (lit. Baron of the Passage).

On the ground, however, events were less successful for the allies. After the failure of the fourth Brazilian attack, the fort's commander Olavarrieta evacuated the Paraguayan troops (who had meanwhile run out of ammunition) with the help of the ships Tacuary and Igurey, amidst a delay in the preparation for the next attack from the allies. These vessels had aided in the defense of the fort and its communications; now, they ferried its defenders to Humaitá. Once abandoned, the stronghold was taken by Brazilian troops. Allied losses were estimated at 120 killed and 456 wounded, and Paraguayan at 300 casualties and 9 pieces of artillery.

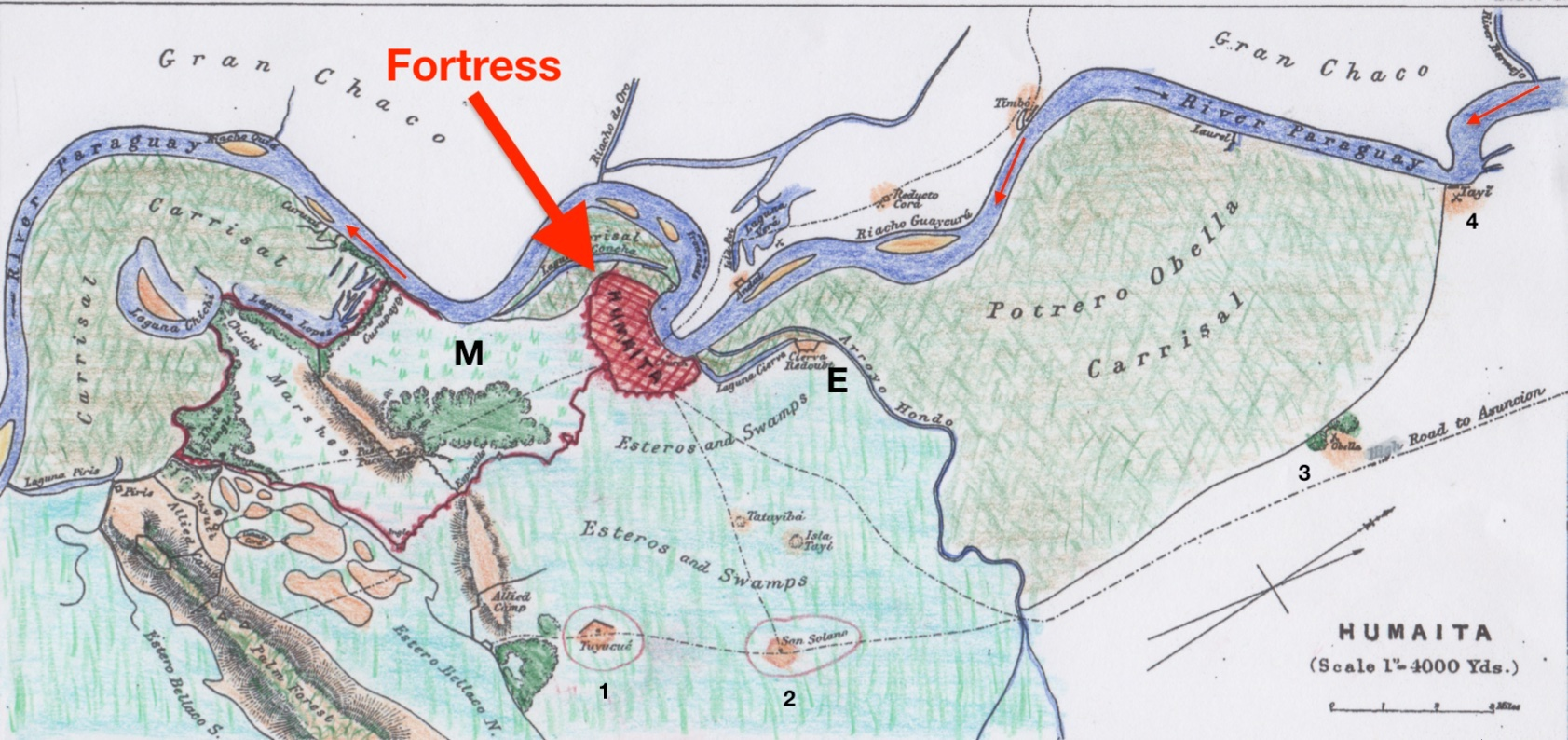
Terrain: Humaitá and its surroundings, showing the almost impassible carrizal and esteros. The Cierva Redoubt can be seen near Humaitá, which is in red. NB north is to the right in this map.)

== Bibliography ==
=== Sources ===
- Centurión, Juan C. (1897). Memorias del coronel Juan Crisóstomo Centurión o sea reminiscencias históricas sobre la Guerra del Paraguay (in Spanish). Vol. 3. Imprenta de Obras de J. A. Berra.
- Doratioto, Francisco (2002). Maldita Guerra: Nova história da Guerra do Paraguai (in Portuguese) (2 ed.). São Paulo: Companhia das Letras. ISBN 978-65-5921-286-6.
- Hooker, Terry D. (2008). The Paraguayan War. Nottingham: Foundry Books. ISBN 978-1901543155.
