= Battle of Tatayibá =

Part of the Paraguayan War

- Part of the Humaitá campaign
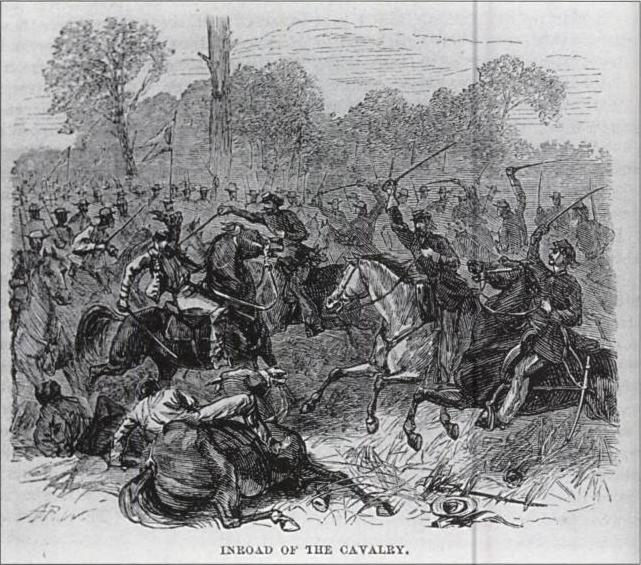
- Cavalry in the Paraguayan War.
Date	October 21, 1867
Location	Tatayibá, Paraguay
Result	Brazilian victory

Belligerents
Paraguay	Empire of Brazil

Commanders and leaders
Bernardino Caballero	Marquess of Caxias

Strength
1,500 cavalry	5,000 cavalry

Casualties and losses
761: 583 killed 178 captured	123: 10 killed 113 wounded

The Battle of Tatayibá was a cavalry engagement between a Paraguayan force led by future president Bernardino Caballero and a Brazilian force led by Luís Alves de Lima e Silva, then Marquis of Caxias. The Brazilians, outnumbering the Paraguayans nearly 3 to 2, were victorious.

A trap was set by the Brazilian cavalry in order to stop the daily sorties by Lt. Col. Caballero's Paraguayan cavalry. Hiding their main force in the woods, a few Brazilians lured the Paraguayan cavalry on a three-mile chase. The Paraguayans were surrounded at Tatayibá, with only a few making it back to Humaitá. Caballero was promoted to colonel and a medal ordered for his survivors.
