= Luís Alves de Lima e Silva, Duke of Caxias =

Brazilian army officer and politician

His Excellency The Duke of Caxias
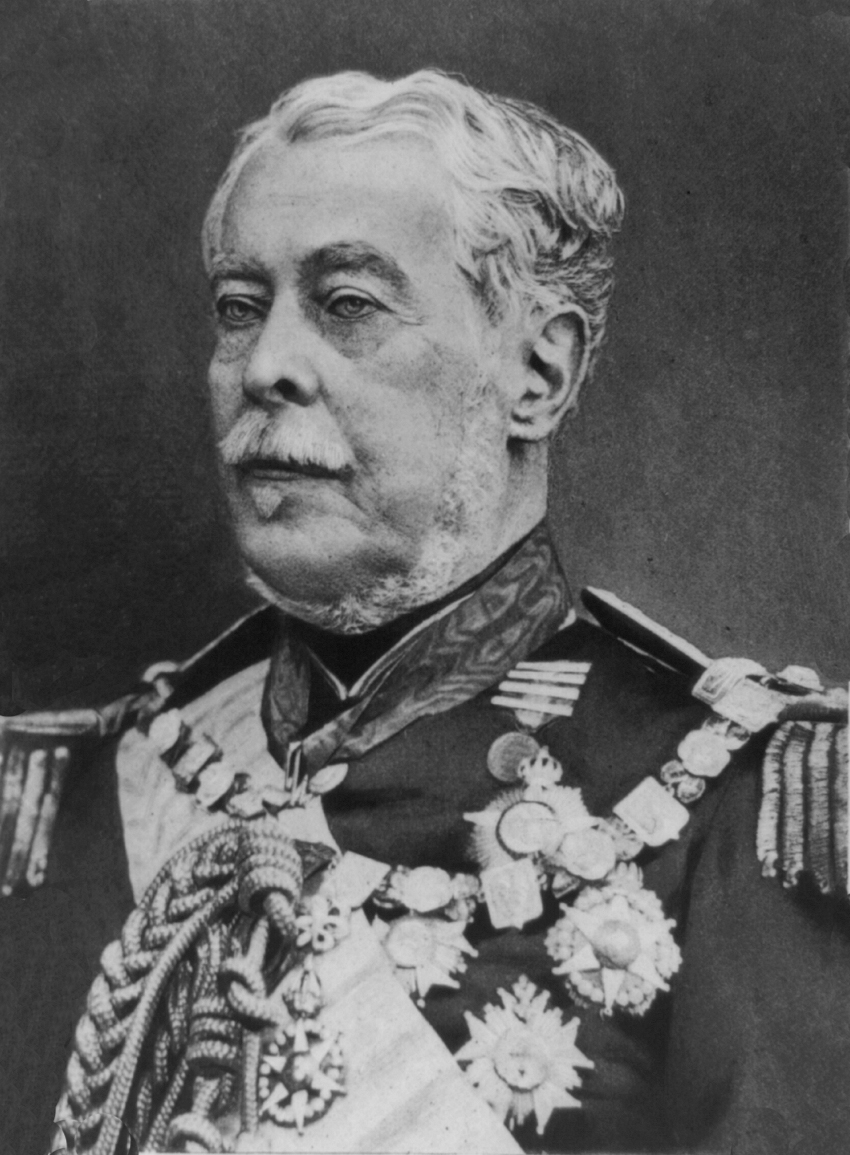
- Caxias in 1878

Prime Minister of Brazil
- In office 25 June 1875 – 5 January 1878
- Monarch: Pedro II
- Preceded by: Viscount of Rio Branco
- Succeeded by: Viscount of Sinimbu
- In office 2 March 1861 – 24 May 1862
- Monarch: Pedro II
- Preceded by: Baron of Uruguaiana
- Succeeded by: Zacarias de Góis
- In office 3 September 1856 – 3 May 1857
- Monarch: Pedro II
- Preceded by: Marquis of Paraná
- Succeeded by: Marquis of Olinda
Further offices held
Minister of War
In office 3 March 1861 – 24 May 1862
Prime Minister	Himself
Preceded by	José Antônio Saraiva
Succeeded by	Count of Porto Alegre
In office 14 June 1855 – 4 May 1857
Prime Minister	Marquis of Paraná; Himself
Preceded by	Pedro Bellegarde
Succeeded by	José Antônio Saraiva
President of Rio Grande do Sul
In office 30 June 1851 – 4 September 1851
Preceded by	Pedro Ferreira de Oliveira
Succeeded by	Patrício Correia da Câmara
In office 9 November 1842 – 11 March 1846
Preceded by	Saturnino Coutinho
Succeeded by	Patrício Correia da Câmara
President of Maranhão
In office 17 February 1840 – 13 May 1841
Preceded by	Manuel de Sousa e Melo
Succeeded by	João Antônio de Miranda

Personal details
- Born: 25 August 1803 São Paulo Farm, (now Duque de Caxias, Rio de Janeiro), State of Brazil
- Died: 7 May 1880 (aged 76) Santa Mônica Farm, (now Valença, Rio de Janeiro), Empire of Brazil
- Party: Conservative (from 1843)
- Occupation: Politician
- Awards: See list
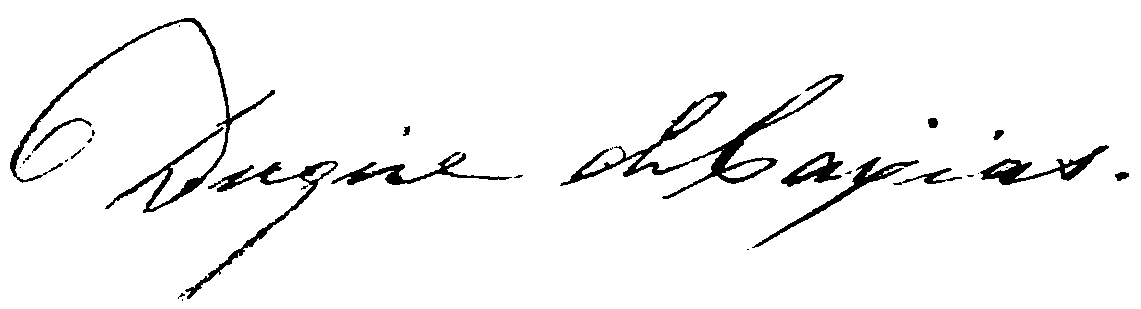
- Signature
- Nicknames: "The Peacemaker"; "The Iron Duke"

Military service
- Allegiance: Empire of Brazil
- Branch/service: Imperial Brazilian Army
- Years of service: 1821–1880
- Rank: Field Marshal
- Battles/wars: See list: Brazilian War of Independence; Siege of Salvador; Cisplatine War; Siege of Montevideo; Balaiada; Liberal rebellions of 1842; Ragamuffin War; Platine War; Paraguayan War; Humaitá campaign; Siege of Humaitá; Battle of Perecué; Battle of Laguna Cierva; Dezembrada; Battle of Ytororó; Battle of Avay; Battle of Lomas Valentinas
- Coat of Arms of the Duke of Caxias

Luís Alves de Lima e Silva, Duke of Caxias (pronounced [kaˈʃi.ɐs]; 25 August 1803 – 7 May 1880), nicknamed "o Pacificador" ("the Peacemaker") and "o Duque de Ferro" ("the Iron Duke"), was an army officer, politician and monarchist of the Empire of Brazil. Like his father and uncles, Caxias pursued a military career. In 1823 he fought as a young officer in the Brazilian War of Independence against Portugal, then spent three years in Brazil's southernmost province, Cisplatina, as the government unsuccessfully resisted that province's secession in the Cisplatine War. Though his own father and uncles renounced Emperor Dom Pedro I during the protests of 1831, Caxias remained loyal. Pedro I abdicated in favor of his young son Dom Pedro II, whom Caxias instructed in swordsmanship and horsemanship and eventually befriended.

During Pedro II's minority the governing regency faced countless rebellions throughout the country. Again breaking with his father and other relatives sympathetic to the rebels, from 1839 to 1845 Caxias commanded loyalist forces suppressing such uprisings as the Balaiada, the Liberal rebellions of 1842 and the Ragamuffin War. In 1851, under his command, the Brazilian army prevailed against the Argentine Confederation in the Platine War; a decade later Caxias, as army marshal (the army's highest rank), led Brazilian forces to victory in the Paraguayan War. As a reward he was raised to the titled nobility, becoming successively a baron, count, and marquis, finally becoming the only person created duke during Pedro II's 58-year reign.

In the early 1840s Caxias became a member of the Reactionary Party, which evolved into the Party of Order and finally the Conservative Party. He was elected senator in 1846. The Emperor appointed him president of the Council of Ministers (prime minister) in 1856; he briefly held that office again in 1861, but fell when his party lost its parliamentary majority. Over the decades Caxias witnessed the growth and zenith of his party, then its slow decline as internal conflict divided it. In 1875, he headed a cabinet for the last time, and after years of failing health he died in May 1880.

In the years after his death and mainly following the downfall of the Brazilian monarchy, Caxias's reputation was initially overshadowed by that of Manuel Luís Osório, Marquis of Erval, but with time surpassed even Erval's renown. In 1925 his birthday was established as the Day of the Soldier, a day of honor for the Brazilian army. On 13 March 1962 he was officially designated the army's protector—its soldierly ideal and the most important figure in its tradition. Historians have regarded Caxias positively, several ranking him as the greatest of Brazil's military officers.

== Early years ==
=== Birth ===
Luís Alves de Lima e Silva was born on 25 August 1803 on a farm called São Paulo (today within the city of Duque de Caxias) located in Rio de Janeiro, then a captaincy (later province) of the Portuguese colony of Brazil. He was the first son and second of ten children of Francisco de Lima e Silva and Mariana Cândido de Oliveira Belo. His godparents were his paternal grandfather, José Joaquim de Lima da Silva, (Note: The family name was "Lima da Silva". Around the time of the Duke of Caxias's birth, all members of the family began signing their name as "Lima e Silva". Their ancestry was mostly Portuguese, although it also included some French ancestors.) and his maternal grandmother, Ana Quitéria Joaquina. Luís Alves's early years were spent on the São Paulo farm owned by his maternal grandfather and namesake, Luís Alves de Freitas. The young boy may have initially been schooled at home, as was common then. He may have been taught to read and write by his grandmother, Ana Quitéria.

Luís Alves's grandfather, José Joaquim, was a Portuguese military officer who had emigrated in 1767 to Brazil. He settled in the city of Rio de Janeiro, capital of both the Rio de Janeiro captaincy and of Brazil. He had neither noble rank nor noble ancestry and lacked patrons in an environment in which advancement depended upon exchanges of favors and family connections. Having fought against the Spaniards on Brazil's southern frontiers, he secured a place for himself in Rio de Janeiro's upper class when he married a member of a local and influential family.

The arrival of the Portuguese Royal Family in Rio de Janeiro in 1808 changed the lives of the Lima family. King Dom João VI embarked upon a series of wars of conquest which resulted in the expansion of Brazil's territory with the annexation of Cisplatina to the south and of French Guiana to the north. By 1818, Luís Alves's relatives, who were military officers and had served in the wars, had been ennobled. His grandfather, José Joaquim, became a member of the Order of Christ and Fidalgo Cavaleiro da Casa Real (Knight Nobleman of the Royal House). His father, Francisco de Lima, and uncles were also granted honors. Within two generations, the Lima family had risen from mere commoners to the ranks of Portugal's untitled nobility.

=== Military education ===
On 22 May 1808, Luís Alves was enlisted at the age of five as a cadet in the 1st Regiment of Infantry of Rio de Janeiro. Historian Adriana Barreto de Souza explained that this did "not mean that he began to serve as a child, the connection to the regiment was simply honorific", his perquisite as the son of a military officer. This infantry regiment was informally known as the "Lima [family] Regiment" because so many members of the family served in it, including his father and grandfather.

In 1811, Luís Alves moved with his parents from his grandparents' farm to Rio de Janeiro and was enrolled at the Seminário São Joaquim (Saint Joachim School), which became Pedro II School in 1837. On 4 May 1818, he was admitted into the Royal Military Academy. The entire course (which ran from the first to seventh year) was mandatory for artillerymen and engineers but infantrymen were only required to take first- and fifth-year classes. Luís Alves took the first- and fifth-year classes in 1818 and 1819, respectively. Though he could have skipped the other years, he chose to take second-year classes in 1820 and third-year classes in 1821. The subjects he studied in the Royal Military Academy ranged from arithmetic, algebra and geometry to tactics, strategy, camping, fortification in campaign and terrain reconnaissance. He was promoted to alferes (equivalent to a modern-day second lieutenant) on 12 October 1818, and to lieutenant (modern-day first lieutenant) on 4 November 1820.

Though an accomplished student, Luís Alves was often reprimanded for bullying new students. With time, he matured, eventually being regarded by his peers as a very reasonable and honest person. He had an ordinary appearance, with a round face, brown hair, brown eyes and average height. Luís Alves's unremarkable features were compensated by his bearing. Historian Thomas Whigham described him as someone who "learned the art of giving orders early in life. Immaculate in his dress, he was soft spoken, polite, and smoothly in control of himself. He seemed to radiate calm composure and authority."

== Wars and military crises ==
=== Independence of Brazil ===
Luís Alves would normally have begun the fourth-year classes at the Royal Military Academy in March 1822. Instead, he dropped out in December 1821 and enlisted in the 1st Fusilier Battalion. Prince Dom Pedro, son and heir of King João VI, had just embarked upon the struggle against Portugal that would lead to the independence of Brazil on 7 September 1822. The prince was later acclaimed Dom Pedro I, the first Brazilian emperor, on 12 October. Those Brazilian and Portuguese forces who remained loyal to Portugal refused to accept this outcome, which led to a war fought on several fronts across Brazil.

On 18 January 1823, Pedro I created the Emperor's Battalion, a handpicked elite infantry unit that included Luís Alves, who was named as adjutant to the company's commander, his uncle, Colonel José Joaquim de Lima e Silva. The Emperor's Battalion was sent to the province of Bahia in the northeast on 28 January and placed, along with other troops, under the command of French Brigadier Pierre Labatut. The Brazilian imperial forces besieged Bahia's capital, Salvador, which was held by the Portuguese. During the siege, Luís Alves fought in at least three attacks (on 28 March, 3 May and 3 June) against Portuguese positions around Salvador, all successful. In the engagement on 28 March, he led a charge on an enemy bunker.

During the Bahia campaign, high-ranking officers mutinied against Labatut, who was taken prisoner and sent back to Rio de Janeiro. It is unlikely that Luís Alves was involved, (Note: All that is known is that Luís Alves signed the minutes of a meeting among officers of the Right and Center Brigades who had decided to send a delegation to their Commander-in-Chief, Pierre Labatut, to petition him to reconcile with officers of the Left Brigade with whom he had become estranged. The meeting had barely ended when two officers of the Left Brigade arrived, bringing news that Labatut had been arrested. The view of historian Afonso de Carvalho is that Luís Alves, whose name appears last in the minutes, signed under protest and felt uncomfortable with the idea of sending a delegation to talk with the commander-in-chief. Taking a part in a plot to remove Labatut from the command and arrest him would have been even more unlikely. Also, unlike his uncle and other relatives in the army, he was not rewarded with any commission by the conspirators.) but his uncle, Joaquim de Lima, was almost certainly part of the conspiracy and was chosen by the officers to replace Labatut. The campaign resumed, and the Portuguese withdrew from Salvador and set sail back to Portugal. On 2 July, the victorious Brazilians entered the city. The Emperor's Battalion returned to Rio de Janeiro, and Luís Alves was later promoted to captain on 22 January 1824.

=== Cisplatine War and the abdication crisis ===
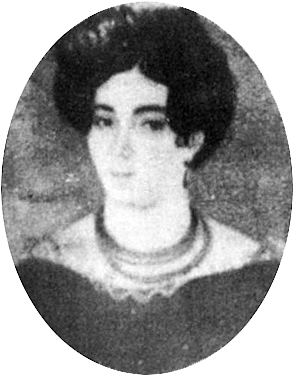
María Ángela Furriol, the Hispanic American who may have been Caxias's fiancée

The Portuguese garrison in Montevideo, the capital of Cisplatina (then Brazil's southernmost province), was the last to surrender. In 1825, secessionists in the province rebelled. The United Provinces of the Río de la Plata (later Argentina) attempted to annex Cisplatina. Brazil declared war, triggering the Cisplatine War. The Emperor's Battalion, to which Luís Alves was attached, was sent to guard Montevideo, then besieged by rebel forces. Luís Alves fought in engagements against the insurgents during 1827 (7 February, 5 July, 7 July, 14 July, 5 August and 7 August).

The war came to a disastrous end in 1828, as Brazil relinquished Cisplatina, which became the independent nation of Uruguay. Nonetheless, Luís Alves was promoted to the rank of major on 2 December 1828 and made second-in-command of the Emperor's Battalion in early 1829. During his stay in Montevideo, he met María Ángela Furriol González Luna. How far their relationship progressed is unknown, but there may have been a failed engagement. He returned to Rio de Janeiro and witnessed the increasing deterioration in Emperor Pedro I's political position. A growing opposition to Pedro I's policies eventually erupted into mass protests at the Field of Santana in downtown Rio de Janeiro on 6 April 1831. The situation became more ominous when several military units, led by Luís Alves's father and uncles, joined the protests.

The Emperor considered appointing Luís Alves to command the Emperor's Battalion and asked him which side he would choose. According to historian Francisco Doratioto, Luís Alves answered that "between the love of his father and his duty to the crown, he would stay with the latter." Pedro I expressed gratitude for his loyalty, but instead ordered him to take the Emperor's Battalion to the Field of Santana and join the rebels, preferring abdication to bloodshedding. Decades later, Luís Alves said in the Brazilian Senate: "I marched along with the Emperor's Battalion to the Field of Santana, out of devotion to competent orders [from Pedro I]. I was not a revolutionary. I esteemed the Abdication. I judged that it would be of advantage to Brazil, but I did not concur directly or indirectly with it."

=== Era of troubles ===
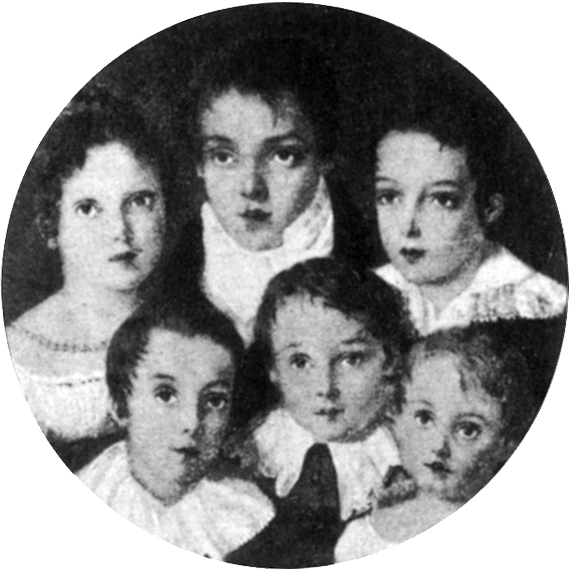
Ana Luísa de Loreto, wife of Caxias, as a child (bottom right) along with her siblings

A regency of three was elected to rule until the five-year-old Dom Pedro II reached the age of majority and the ability to rule in his own right. One of the regents chosen was Luís Alves's father. The regency had little effective authority, resulting in nine years of chaos, during which the country was plagued by rebellions and coup attempts initiated by unruly political factions. The army, "demoralized by the far from exemplary part it had played in the April Revolution [i.e. Pedro I's abdication]," said historian C. H. Haring, "became the ready tool of any popular agitator or demagogue, and often the source of riot and sedition." The government severely reduced the size of the standing army and effectively replaced it with the newly created National Guard, a militia force. In July 1831, without troops to command, Luís Alves and other officers joined the Volunteer Soldier-Officers Battalion as soldiers. As second in command of that unit, he put down a mutiny of navy artillerymen led by Miguel de Frias e Vasconcelos in the Ilha das Cobras on 7 October. A year later, on 18 October 1832, he was appointed commander of the Permanent Municipal Guard Corps, a police force in the city of Rio de Janeiro.

On 6 January 1833, at age 29, he married Ana Luísa de Loreto Carneiro Viana, the sixteen-year-old younger sister of an army officer friend, and a member of an aristocratic family of Rio de Janeiro. The union was contrary to the wishes of the bride's mother, who saw Luís Alves and his family as upstarts. Newspapers connected to political enemies of his family took advantage of this disagreement to level serious, but unfounded, accusations against him, including that he had kidnapped Ana Luísa. Despite the invective, their marriage was a happy one and three children resulted: Luísa de Loreto Viana de Lima, Ana de Loreto Viana de Lima and Luís Alves de Lima e Silva, born in 1833, 1836 and 1847, respectively.

In the late 1830s, Luís Alves was appointed instructor in swordsmanship and horsemanship to the young Pedro II. Ties of duty had drawn the two men together, but a long-lasting friendship and personal devotion also developed. Pedro II said many years later that he regarded Luís Alves as "loyal and my friend". According to historian Heitor Lira, Luís Alves was "one of the rare, sincere and profoundly convicted monarchists and friends of the King [i.e., the Emperor] and of the Dynasty [the House of Braganza]. He placed his sword not only in service to a united and strong Brazil, but also to a worthy and respected Monarch".

== Quelling rebellions ==
=== Balaiada ===
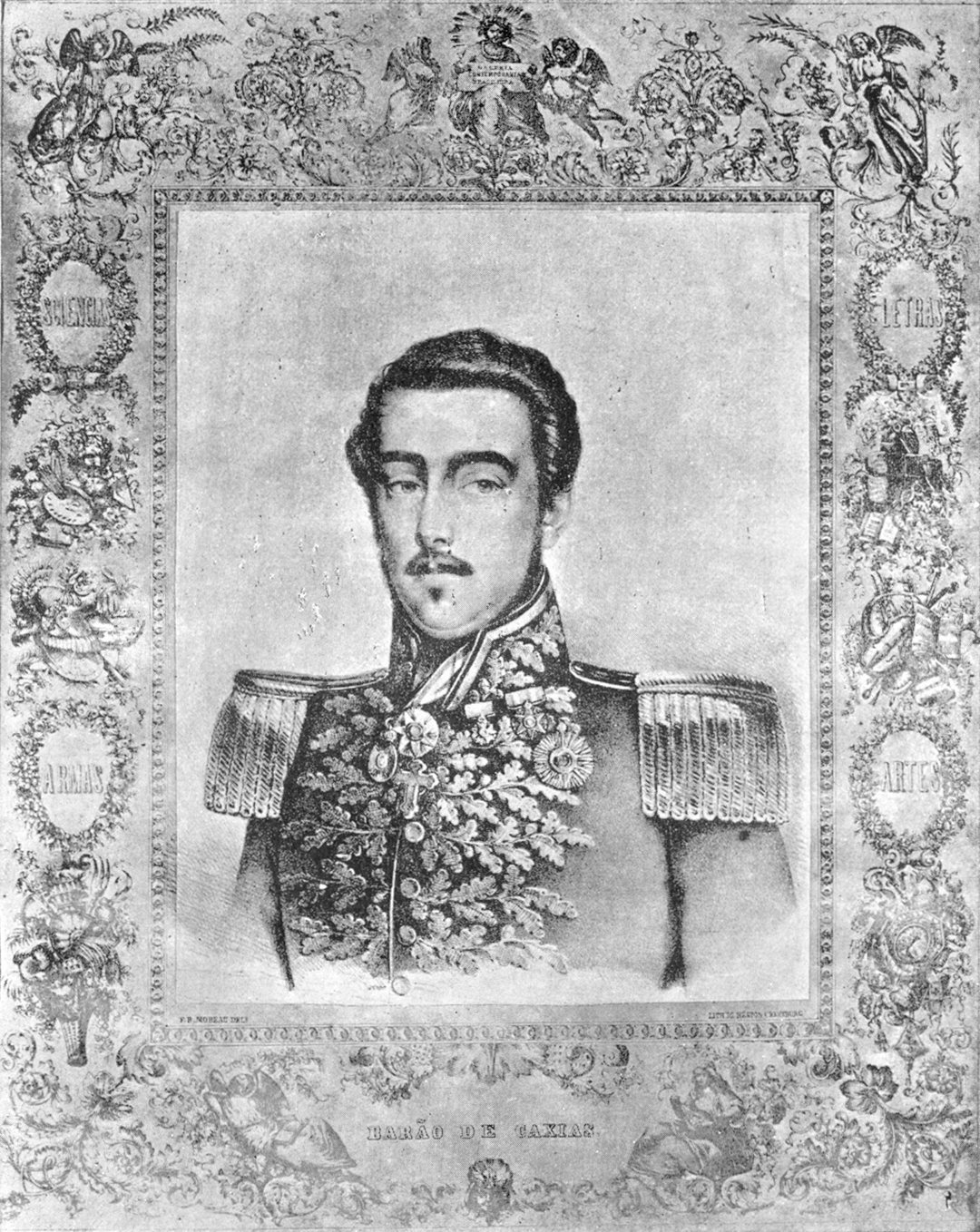
Luís Alves de Lima e Silva, then-Baron of Caxias, around age 38, c. 1841

As the commander of the Permanent Municipal Guard Corps, Luís Alves brought order to the streets of Rio de Janeiro, through his own skill and through partnership with the city's chief of police, Eusébio de Queirós. Luís Alves was promoted from major to lieutenant colonel on 12 September 1837. Eusébio de Queirós was a member of the Partido Regressista (Reactionary Party), which had come to power that year. Bernardo Pereira de Vasconcelos, one of the leading Reactionaries and a government minister, attempted to attract Luís Alves to his party.

After being promoted to colonel on 2 December 1839, Luís Alves was sent by the Reactionary cabinet to the province of Maranhão to quell a rebellion which became known as the Balaiada. He was appointed to the highest civilian and military positions in the province: presidente (president or governor) and comandante das armas (military commander), thus giving him authority over the National Guard and army (brought back to full strength by the Reactionary administration) units in the province, respectively.

Luís Alves arrived in São Luís, Maranhão's capital, on 4 February 1840. After several battles and skirmishes, he defeated the rebels. For his achievement, Luís Alves was promoted to brigadier (present-day brigadier general) on 18 July 1841 and raised by Pedro II to the titled nobility as Barão de Caxias (Baron of Caxias). He was given the rare honor of choosing his title; he decided to commemorate his recapture of Caxias, Maranhão's second richest town, which had fallen into rebel hands. Francisco de Lima wrote to his son with news of the Liberals' demand that Pedro II's majority be immediately declared. Meanwhile, Honório Hermeto Carneiro Leão (later Marquis of Paraná, a distant cousin of Caxias's wife and a leader of the Reactionary Party) sent letters to Luís Alves attempting to undermine the influence Francisco de Lima had on him and to dissuade him from supporting the unconstitutional proposal to declare the Emperor of age.

=== Liberal rebellions of 1842 ===
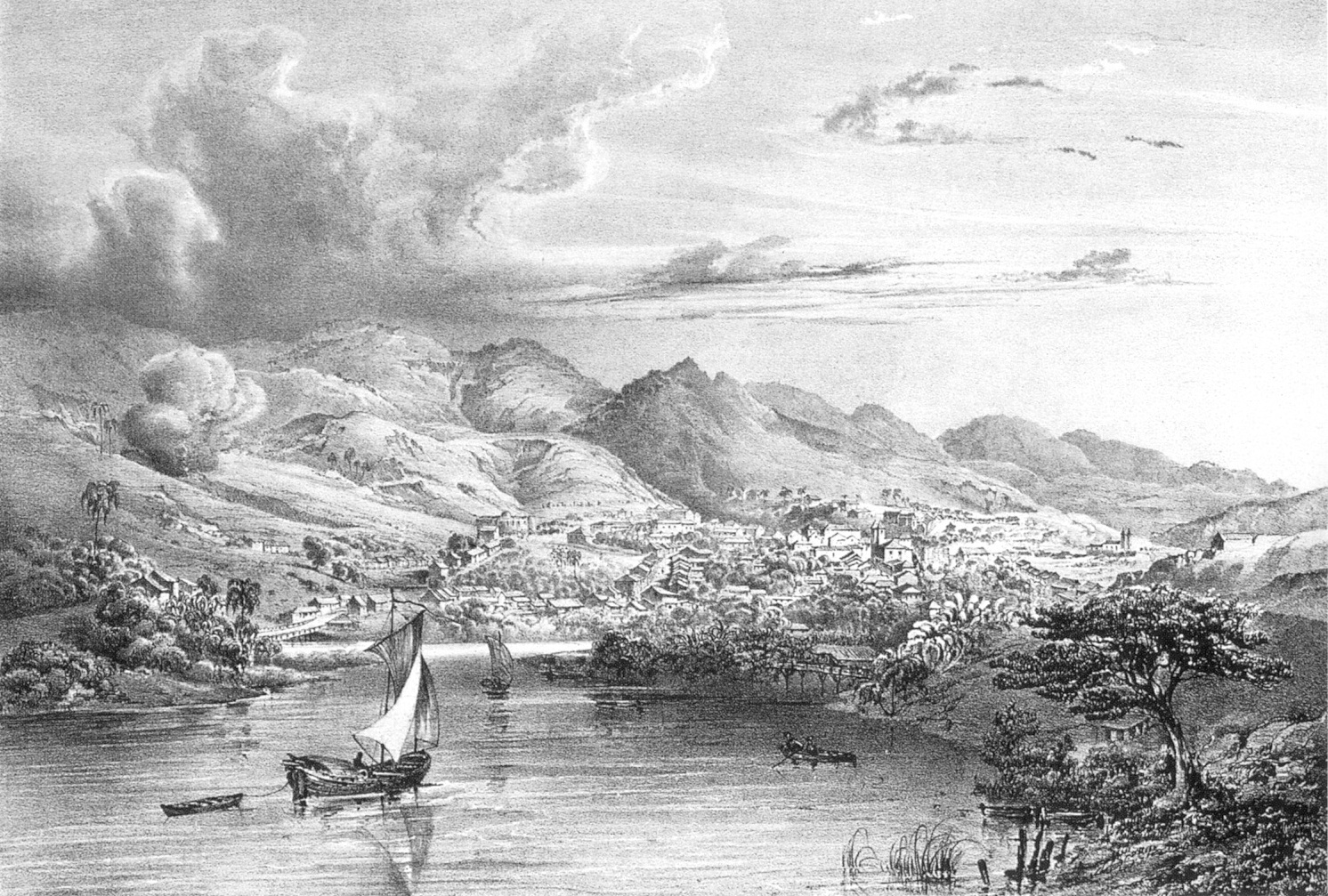
Sabará (pictured) was one of the towns Caxias marched into during the 1842 Liberal rebellion in Minas Gerais province

Upon his return from Maranhão, Caxias saw that the political climate had changed. Francisco de Lima's Liberal Party had pushed through the premature declaration of the Emperor's majority on 23 July 1840. In May 1842, the Liberals rebelled in the provinces of Rio de Janeiro, São Paulo and Minas Gerais in retaliation for the Emperor's decision—on the advice of a Council of State dominated by Reactionaries—to call for new elections, annulling the previous election tainted by widespread fraud by the Liberal Party.

Named as the province's vice-president and military commander, Caxias arrived in São Paulo on 21 May 1842. After he defeated the rebels there, he was appointed military commander of Minas Gerais and marched to that province. With the aid of National Guard units from Rio de Janeiro under its president, Honório Hermeto, Caxias was once again successful, and by late August, the rebellion was crushed. Caxias was honored by Pedro II, who made him his aide-de-camp on 23 July 1842. Two days later, Caxias was promoted to brevet (acting) field marshal (present-day divisional general).

To distinguish itself from what the Reactionaries perceived as the "unruly" Liberals, sometime around 1843 (and certainly by 1844), the Reactionary Party became known as the Partido da Ordem (Party of Order) and its members as saquaremas. Caxias increasingly identified himself with the saquarema ideology: (Note: On 19 August 1861, Caxias said in the Senate: "In my entire life I took as a rule always to obey, without hesitation, all orders from the government. After I entered the parliament, having to manifest a political opinion, I aligned with those [the Conservatives] who, by their ideas and their behavior, seemed to me to offer the greatest guarantees for the order of my country. I have held myself unshakably faithful to those ideas.") liberalism, preservation of the authority of the state, and support for representative parliamentary monarchy. Although his move toward the saquarema camp was not clear at the time he accepted the appointment to put down the rebellion in Maranhão in 1839, his victory over the Liberal rebels in 1842 further solidified his allegiance to the Party of Order.

=== Ragamuffin War ===
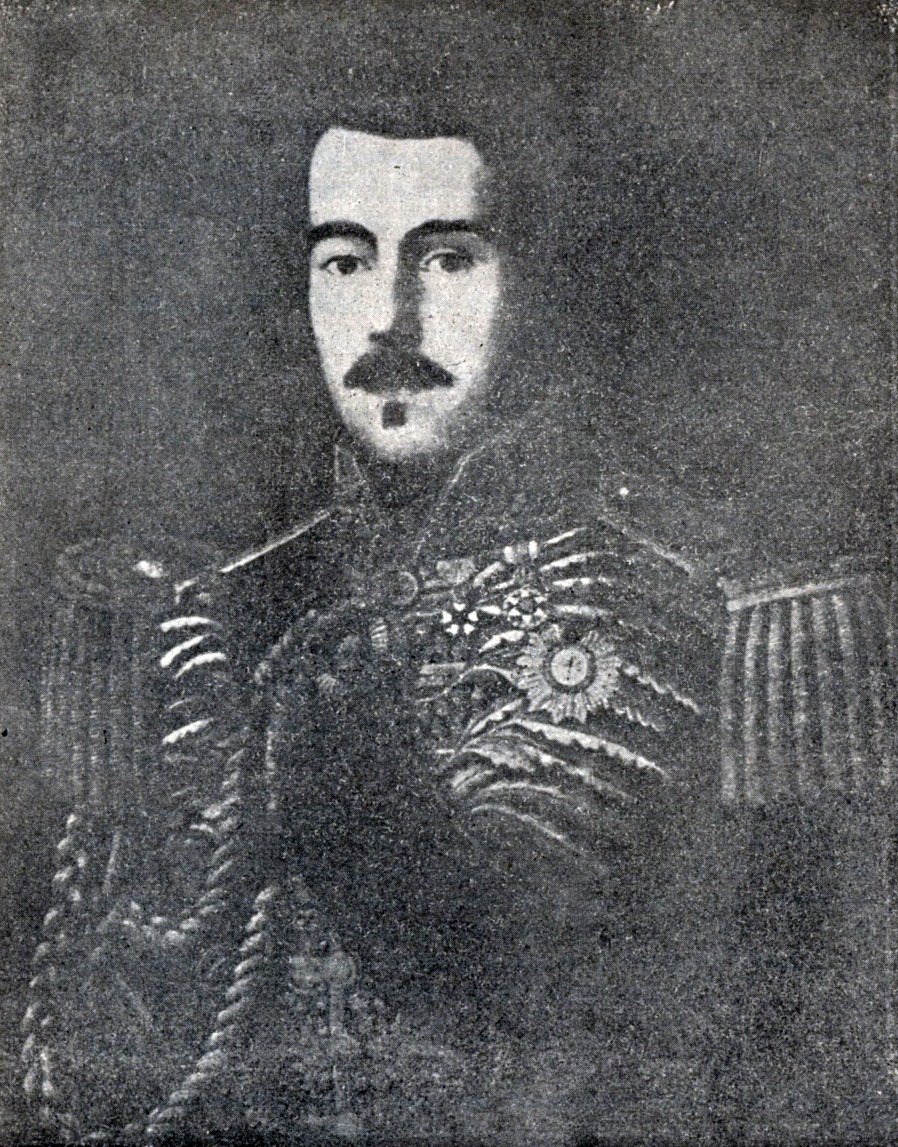
The then-Count of Caxias, around age 43, c. 1846

When the republican secessionist rebellion known as the Ragamuffin War began in Rio Grande do Sul in 1835, João Manuel de Lima e Silva, one of Caxias's uncles, joined the rebels. His father, Francisco de Lima, and possibly another uncle (the Minister of War at the time), also secretly supported the rebellion. On 28 September 1842, Caxias was appointed president and military commander of the province of Rio Grande do Sul. The 16-year-old Pedro II allowed Caxias to prove once more that he was unlike his father and uncles and gave him a short and direct order: "End this revolution, as you have ended the others." Caxias brought with him a fellow saquarema and a famous poet, Domingos Gonçalves de Magalhães (later Viscount of Araguaia), to serve as his secretary, as he had previously in Maranhão.

Caxias had made a short trip to Rio Grande do Sul in 1839 to inspect the troops fighting the Ragamuffins. Upon his return to the province in November 1842, he found that the rebels, severely weakened after years of struggle, had been forced to resort to guerrilla warfare. When threatened, the rebels escaped to safety in nearby Uruguay (formerly Cisplatina). As in Maranhão, São Paulo and Minas Gerais, Caxias planted spies within the enemy's ranks to gather information and to foment dissension. Historian Roderick J. Barman said that he "displayed military, organizational, and political talents essential to what is now termed 'counterinsurgency'."

In early 1843, Honório Hermeto became the head of the cabinet, and so long as the saquaremas remained in power, Caxias was secure in his position. After Honório Hermeto quarreled with Pedro II a year later, he and the saquaremas resigned. The Liberals replaced the saquaremas in government, but Caxias was retained in his command. The War of the Ragamuffins took far longer to put down than had previous rebellions, but through careful negotiation and military victories, Caxias finally managed to pacify the province. The end of the armed conflict was declared on 1 March 1845. He was made a permanent field marshal on 25 March, and raised to the rank of count on 2 April. Caxias ran for a Senate seat, and being among the three candidates with the most votes, he was selected by the Emperor in late 1845 as the senator representing Rio Grande do Sul. He took his Senate seat on 11 May 1846.

== Conservatism ==
=== Platine War ===
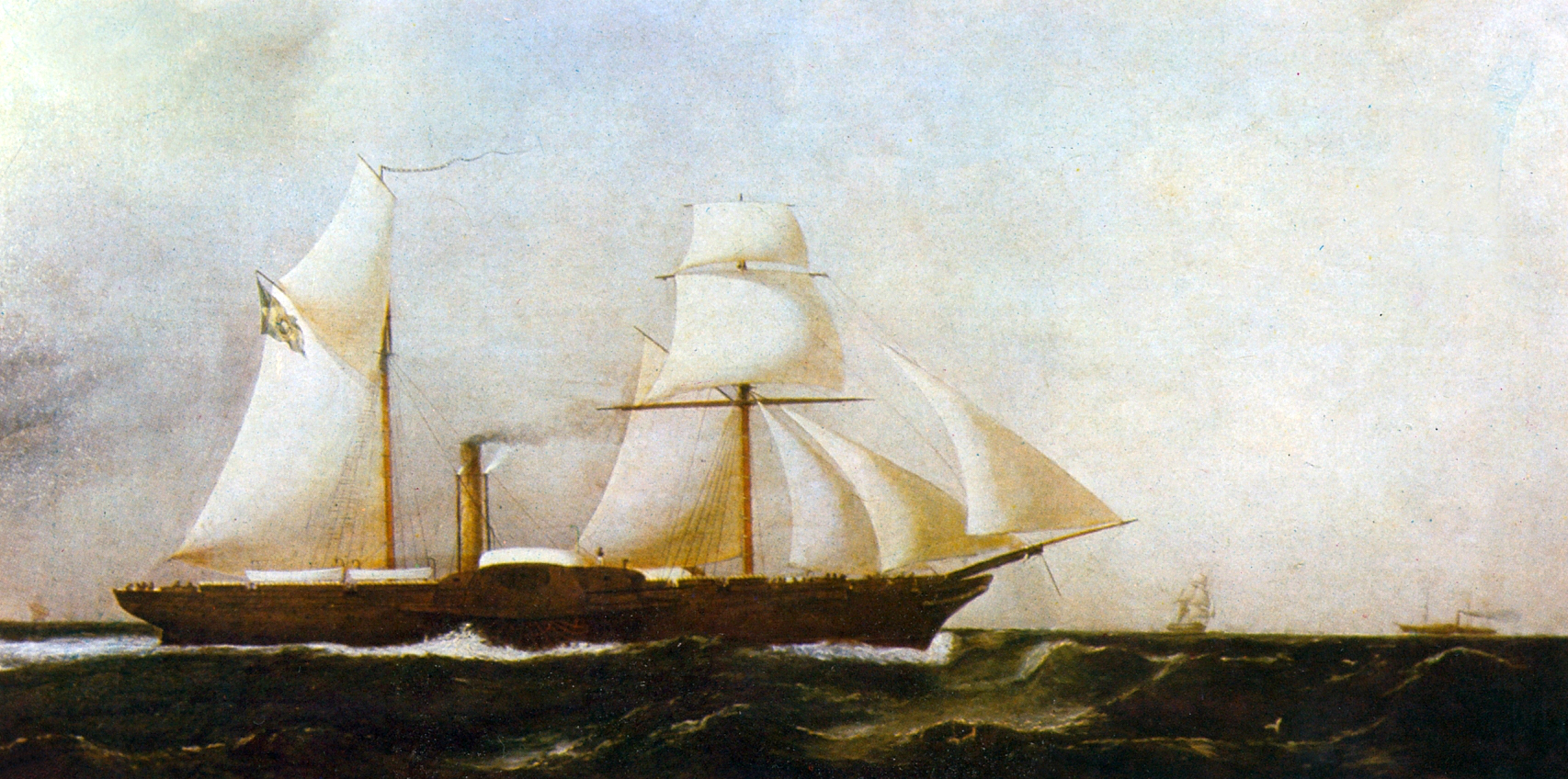
The steamship Dom Afonso, aboard which Caxias scouted the port area of Buenos Aires for a later canceled attack

After years in opposition in the parliament, in September 1848, the Party of Order was called upon by Pedro II to form a new cabinet. The saquarema cabinet was composed of men with whom Caxias had close relationships, among them Eusébio de Queirós, who had helped him bring order to the streets of Rio de Janeiro in the late 1830s. Caxias was now a wealthy planter who owned slaves and was very much a part of the landed aristocracy that formed the backbone of the Party of Order. With the help of his wealthy mother-in-law, he purchased his first property—a coffee farm—in 1838. He acquired more lands in 1849, further expanding his plantation. Due to growing international demand, coffee had become the most valuable export commodity for Brazil.

In 1851, Juan Manuel de Rosas, dictator of the Argentine Confederation, declared war on Brazil. Caxias was appointed commander-in-chief of the Brazilian land forces. The Minister of Foreign Affairs, Paulino Soares de Sousa (later Viscount of Uruguai), forged an anti-Rosas alliance between Brazil, Uruguay and rebel Argentine provinces. When Paulino Soares asked who should be appointed as Brazil's representative among the allied forces, Caxias suggested Honório Hermeto. Honório Hermeto, who had been ostracized by his peers after his fall in 1844, was the saquarema closest to Caxias.

An army commanded by Caxias crossed into Uruguay in September 1851. The allies decided to divide their forces into two armies: a multinational force that included a single Brazilian division, and a second army composed entirely of Brazilians under Caxias. Against the wishes of Honório Hermeto, Caxias chose Manuel Marques de Sousa (later Count of Porto Alegre) to lead the former force. Caxias met and befriended Marques de Sousa, who had served under his command in the War of the Ragamuffins, during his trip to Rio Grande do Sul in 1839. The Brazilian division, led by Marques de Sousa, along with Uruguayan and Argentine rebel troops, invaded Argentina. On 3 February 1852, in the Battle of Caseros, the allies defeated an army led by Rosas, who fled to the United Kingdom, thus ending the war. Caxias spent 17 January aboard the frigate Dom Afonso alongside John Pascoe Grenfell, taking stock of the port area of Buenos Aires, the Argentine capital, selecting the best place to launch an amphibious attack. His plan was aborted once the news of the victory at Caseros arrived. As a reward for his role in the victory, Caxias was promoted to lieutenant general on 3 March, and raised to marquis on 26 June.

=== Conciliation Cabinet ===
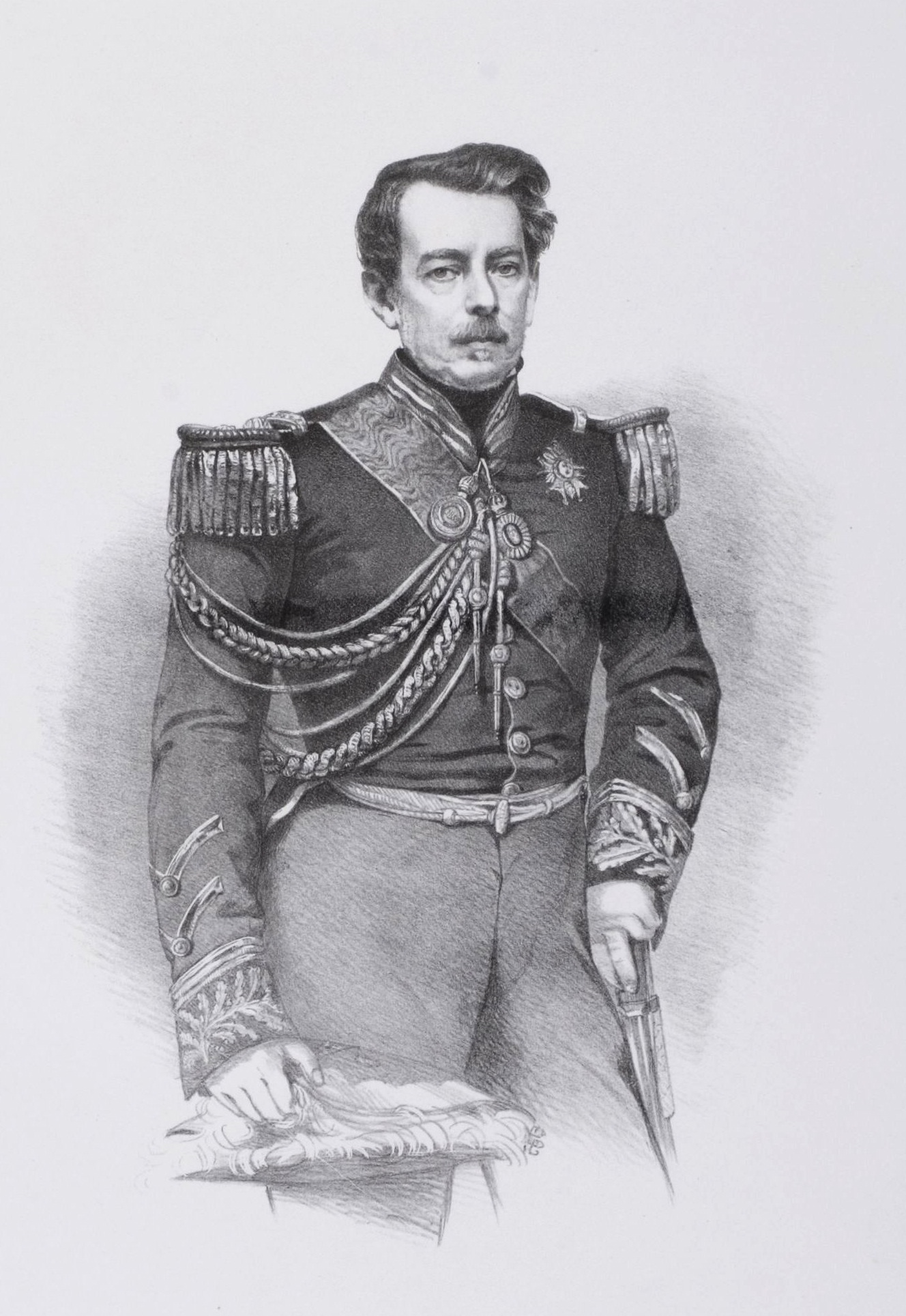
Caxias around age 54, c. 1857

Caxias's father died in December 1853. For years, father and son had clashed, taking opposite sides. The marquis ultimately prevailed, adhering closely to his grandfather José Joaquim de Lima's steadfast loyalty to the Crown and respect for the law. By the time of his death, Francisco de Lima, a senator in his own right, had long since lost his former influence and had not held any office of importance for years. Nevertheless, Caxias and Francisco de Lima maintained a loving and respectful relationship to the very end, as may be seen in the few surviving letters between them. His relationship with other family members, however, was marred by resentment, as he told his wife years later: "We are placed in the foreground of our society, causing even envy to your relatives and to mine as well."

Around 1853 (and certainly by 1855), the old Party of Order had become more widely known as the Conservative Party. On 14 June 1855, the marquis accepted the portfolio of Minister of War and joined the "Conciliation Cabinet" headed by Honório Hermeto (now Marquis of Paraná). Caxias and Paraná had known each other since 1831 and had formed a deep friendship and strong bond based on trust and views in common. Paraná had been facing overwhelming opposition in parliament from members of his, and Caxias's, own party. Under the guise of correcting flaws in elections so that all parties would have legitimate access to representation in parliament, Paraná attempted to pass electoral reforms that would, in practice, allot cabinets even more influence to meddle in elections through coercion and patronage. The saquaremas understood the threat: it would undermine their own party (or in fact any party) by strengthening the executive branch to the detriment of the legislative.

In search of broader support, Paraná appointed as ministers politicians who had few, or no, links to the saquaremas. Caxias himself was a saquarema, but according to Needell, he "was first and foremost a military man. Personal fealty to the Empire came before any other. As so many did, he identified this loyalty with fealty to the Crown in abstraction and to Dom Pedro personally." He was a choice that could please all sides. Caxias, said Needell, "was not so much a political man as a man profoundly loyal to the Monarchy with which he ... had come to identify with the Conservative Party. Thus, Paraná may have appointed Caxias to reassure traditional Conservatives without endangering the more independent political position Paraná was taking."

=== Presidencies of the Council of Ministers ===
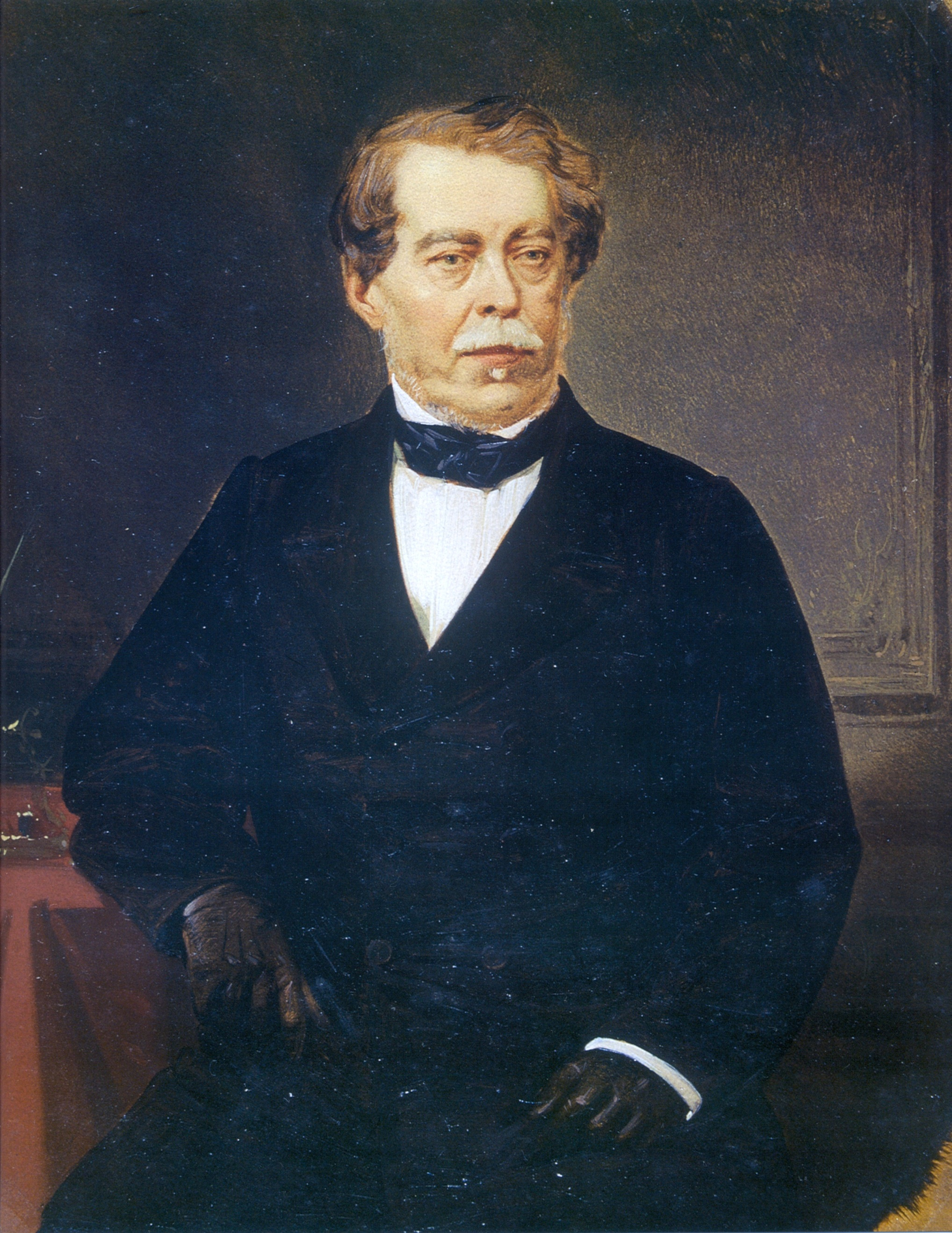
Caxias around age 58, c. 1861

Paraná succeeded in passing electoral reform, which was called the Lei dos Círculos (Law of the Circles). As predicted, and feared, it gave greater powers to the president (prime minister) of the Council of Ministers to meddle in elections. Unexpectedly, Paraná fell ill and died on 3 September 1856. Caxias replaced him, but was reluctant to face the legislature, elected under the electoral reform, that was slated to convene the next year. He resigned, along with the other cabinet ministers, on 4 May 1857. The Law of the Circles and the controversy surrounding it split the Conservative Party: one faction was the saquarema ultraconservative (or traditionalist) wing, then called the vermelhos (reds) or puritanos (puritans), led by Eusébio de Queirós, Uruguai and Joaquim Rodrigues Torres, Viscount of Itaboraí. The second bloc comprised the conservador moderado (moderate Conservative) wing, composed mostly of younger politicians who owed their positions to electoral reform.

The moderate Conservatives were Conservatives in name only, and did not support the saquarema ideology and leadership. During the years following 1857, successive cabinets quickly collapsed, unable to muster a majority in the Chamber of Deputies, as the two Conservative wings undercut each other in a fight for dominance. The Emperor asked Caxias to head a new cabinet on 2 March 1861. Among his ministers were José Maria da Silva Paranhos (later Viscount of Rio Branco), whom Caxias had met and befriended during the Platine War while serving as secretary to Paraná.

Caxias tried to secure support from the traditional saquarema leadership. They attempted, however, to use him as a figurehead and to further their own agendas. He commented to Paranhos: "I see what you meant, with respect to the bizarre behavior of these gentlemen, who do not wish to govern the country, when they are invited to do so, because they prefer to govern the Government. They are completely mistaken about me, since I am not disposed to serve them as a hobbyhorse." Lacking support in parliament, Caxias's cabinet resigned on 24 May 1862 after losing its majority in the Chamber of Deputies (the national legislature's lower house). Pedro II asked members of the Liga Progressista (Progressive League)—a new party consisting of moderate Conservatives and Liberals—to form a new cabinet. Barely a month later, Caxias's only son died at age 14 of unknown causes. There was a small consolation at the end of 1862 when, on 2 December, he was made brevet marechal de exército (army marshal), the highest rank in the Brazilian army.

== Paraguayan War ==
=== Siege of Uruguaiana ===
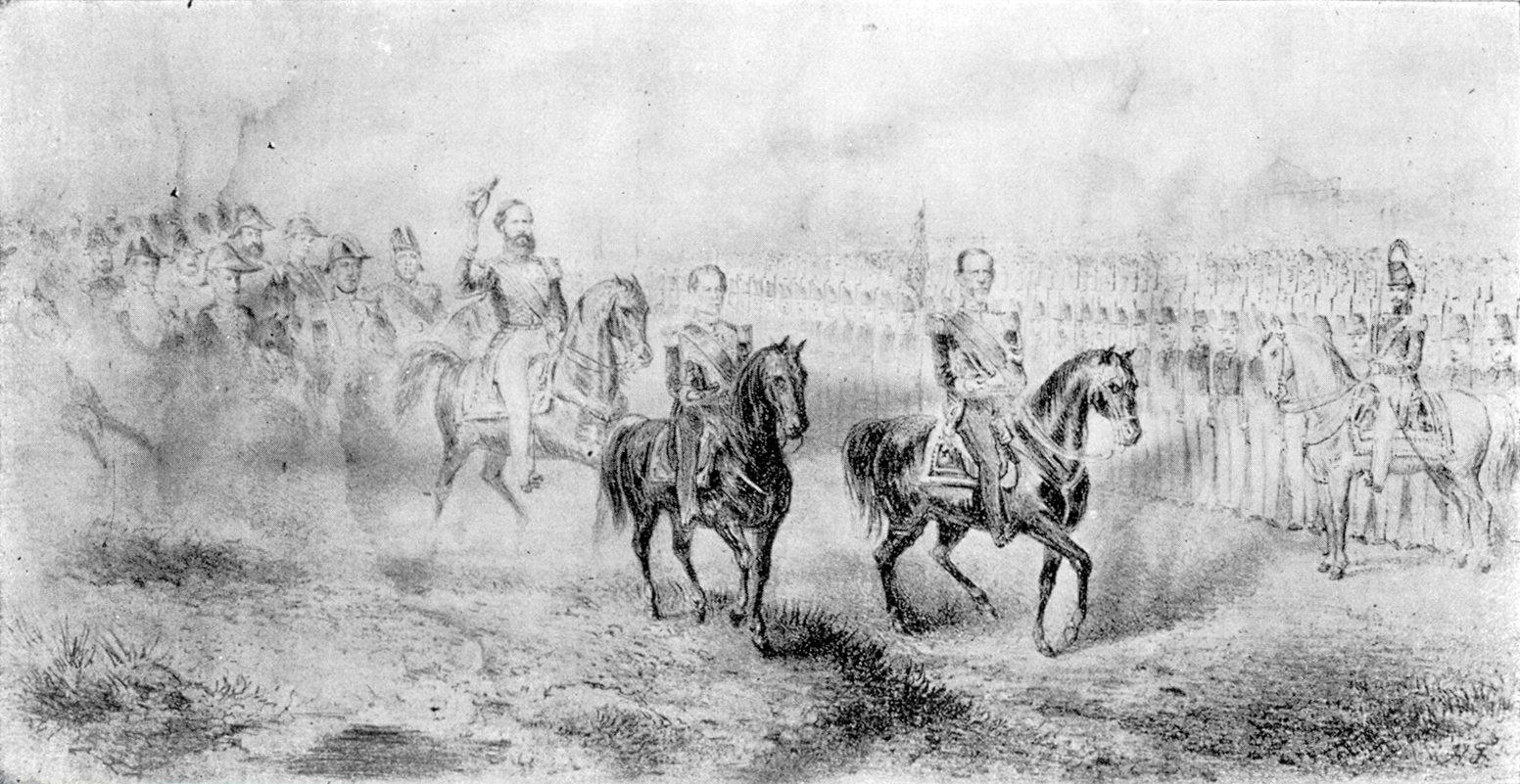
Pedro II (raising his hat) follows behind his two aides-de-camp, one of them Caxias (center). This military parade most probably occurred during the siege of Uruguaiana at the beginning of the Paraguayan War.

In December 1864, the dictator of Paraguay, Francisco Solano López, took advantage of Brazil's military intervention in Uruguay to establish his country as a regional power. The Paraguayan army invaded the Brazilian province of Mato Grosso (currently the state of Mato Grosso do Sul), triggering the Paraguayan War. Four months later, Paraguayan troops invaded Argentine territory in preparation for an attack on Rio Grande do Sul.

The situation in Rio Grande do Sul was chaotic, and the local military commanders were incapable of mounting an effective resistance to the Paraguayan army. Pedro II, aware of the danger, decided to go to the front to shore up operations. As the Emperor's military aide-de-camp, Caxias followed him into the combat zone. The marquis had warned the Progressive cabinet that Brazil was unprepared to intervene in Uruguay and even less prepared to resist a foreign invasion. His warnings were ignored, and he complained, with a bit of irony, to his friend João Maurício Vanderlei, Baron of Cotejipe, a former colleague in the Conciliation cabinet: "I am almost mad with the mistakes that I am seeing being made, but since I am a red [ultraconservative or traditional saquarema] I am not listened to, since everything is progress in our country."

The imperial party arrived in Rio Grande do Sul's capital, Porto Alegre, in July 1865. From there, they traveled inland until they reached Uruguaiana in September. This Brazilian town was occupied by a Paraguayan army. By the time Caxias and his party arrived, the town was under siege by a combined force of Brazilian, Argentine and Uruguayan units. The Paraguayans surrendered without further bloodshed, freeing the Emperor and Caxias to return to the imperial capital.

=== Commander-in-Chief ===
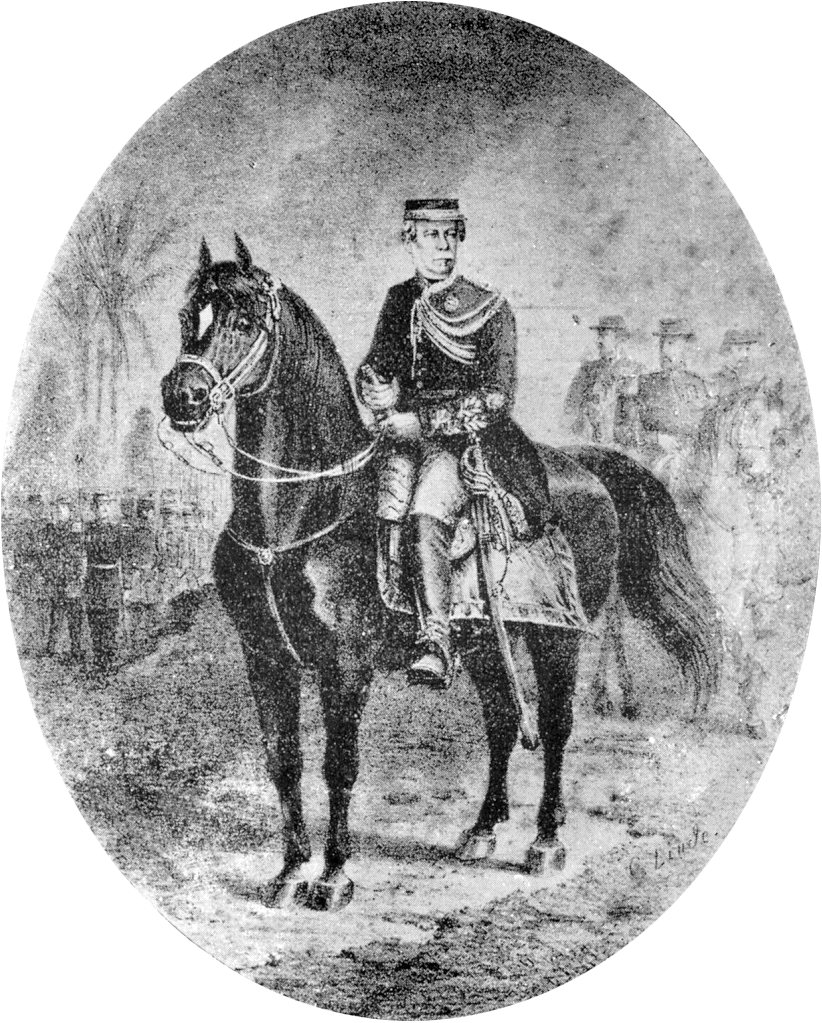
Caxias in Paraguay, c. 1866. He is portrayed in simple campaign uniform, instead of the court dress shown in other pictures

The allies invaded Paraguay in April 1866, but after initial success, their advance was blocked by fortifications at Humaitá by land and along the Paraguay River. The Progressive cabinet decided to create a unified command over Brazilian forces operating in Paraguay, and it turned to the 63-year-old Caxias (made permanent army marshal on 13 January) as the new leader on 10 October 1866. He told his wife that the reason he had accepted the post was because the war "was an evil that has reached more or less all, from the Emperor to the most unfortunate slave."

Caxias arrived in Paraguay on 18 November, and assumed the supreme command of land and naval forces in the war. His first measure was to arrange the dismissal of Vice-Admiral Joaquim Marques Lisboa (later the Marquis of Tamandaré and also a member of the Progressive League) by the government, and appoint fellow Conservative Vice-Admiral Joaquim José Inácio (later the Viscount of Inhaúma) to lead the navy. From October 1866 until July 1867, all offensive operations were suspended. During this period, Caxias trained his soldiers, re-equipped the army with newer guns, improved the quality of the officer corps, and upgraded the health corps and overall hygiene of the troops, putting an end to epidemics. Alfredo d'Escragnolle Taunay (later the Viscount of Taunay), who fought in the war, remembered that Caxias was a "generous military chief, who forgave small errors, but was implacable with those who committed grave misdeeds, or, then, who betrayed his confidence."

As the Brazilian army was ready for combat, Caxias sought to encircle Humaitá and force its capitulation by siege. To aid the operation, he used observation balloons to gather information of the enemy lines. The combined Brazilian–Argentine–Uruguayan army advanced through hostile territory to surround Humaitá. By 2 November, Humaitá was completely cut off from land reinforcement by Paraguayan forces. On 19 February 1868, Brazilian ironclads successfully made a passage up the Paraguay River under heavy fire, gaining full control of the river and isolating Humaitá from resupply by water.

=== Dezembrada ===
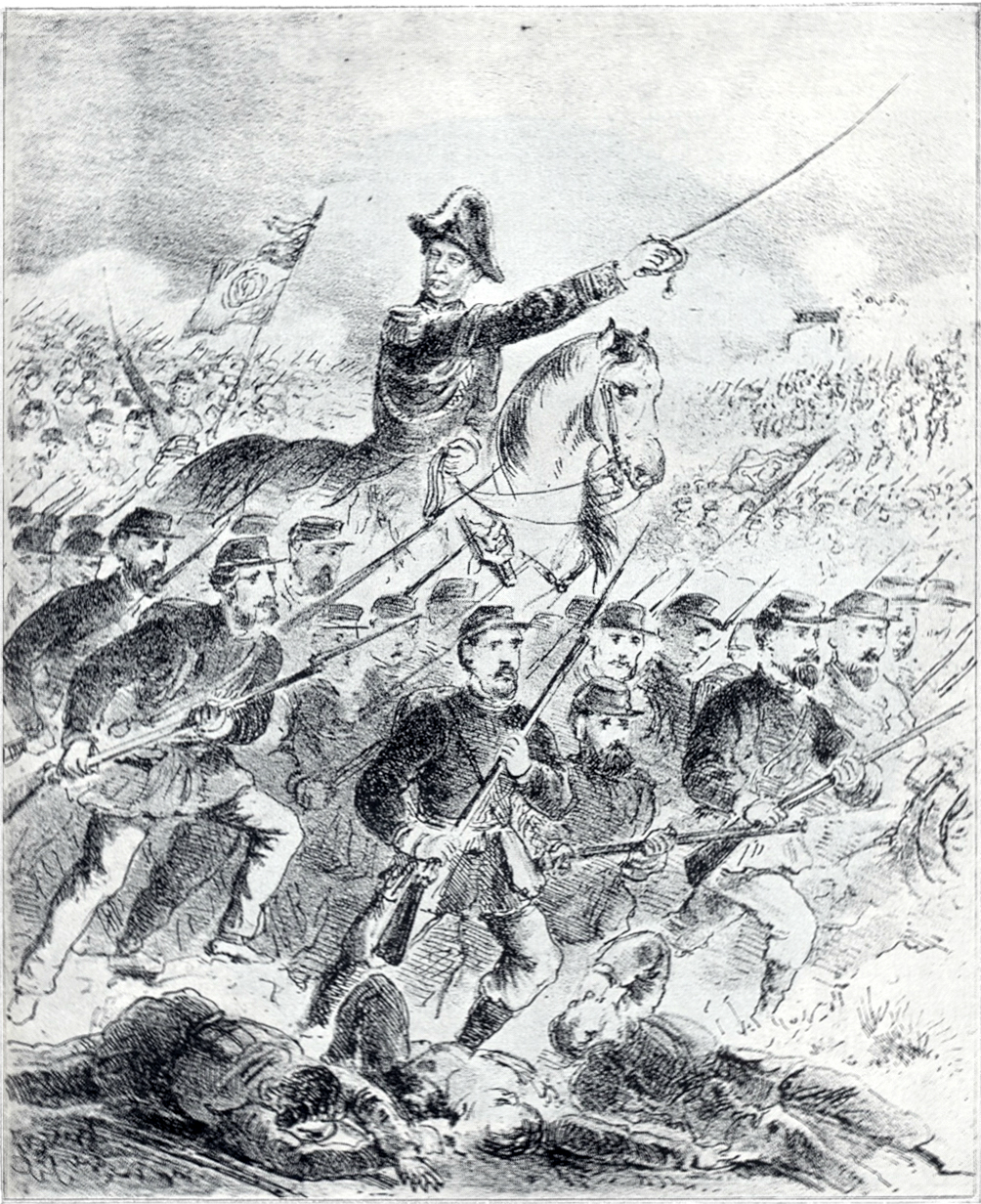
Caxias leads the Brazilian army

The relationship between the Marquis of Caxias, now the allied Commander-in-Chief, (Note: The previous allied Commander-in-Chief was the Argentine President Bartolomé Mitre, whom Caxias replaced on two different occasions. The first was a brief transfer of command which occurred from 9 February 1867 until 1 August 1867, when Mitre traveled to Argentina. Mitre relinquished the position a second, and final, time on 14 January 1868, when several rebellions in Argentina and the death of his Vice-President forced a return to his country. The position of Commander-in-Chief was later abolished officially on 3 October 1868, although the role continued to be filled informally by Caxias.) and the governing Progressives worsened until it became a political crisis that led to the cabinet's resignation. The Emperor called Conservatives, under Itaboraí's leadership, back into power on 16 July 1868, while the Progressive League was rechristened as the Liberal Party. Meanwhile, the allies occupied Humaitá on 25 July after López managed to engineer a successful withdrawal of all Paraguayan troops from its fortress.

Pressing his advantage, the marquis began organizing an assault on the new Paraguayan defenses which López had thrown up along the Pikysyry, south of Asunción (Paraguay's capital). This stream afforded a strong defensive position which was anchored by the Paraguay River and by the swampy jungle of the Chaco region, both considered to be nearly impassable by a large force. Rather than making a frontal attack on López's line, Caxias had a road cut through the Chaco. The road was finished by early December, allowing the allied forces to outflank the Paraguayan lines and attack from the rear. In three successive battles (Ytororó, Avay and Lomas Valentinas) which became known as Dezembrada (Deed of December), the combined allied forces annihilated the Paraguayan army. López barely managed to escape with a few followers, and on 1 January 1869, the Brazilians occupied Asunción. According to historian Ronaldo Vainfas, Caxias's "performance ahead of the allied forces contributed in an unquestionable way to the final triumph over the enemy."

The marquis had to take great risks to win these victories. In the Ytororó engagement, which occurred on 5 December, the allied objective was to take a bridge over the Ytororó River. Several attempts were made to cross the bridge, but each was repelled by intense fire from the Paraguayan positions. In the final attempt, the Brazilian soldiers panicked and began to flee in disorder. Caxias, witnessing the unfolding disaster, unsheathed his sword and charged on horseback toward the bridge, followed by his staff. He passed through the fleeing troops, shouting "Hail to His Majesty", "Hail to Brazil" and finally, "Sigam-me os que forem brasileiros!" ("Those who are true Brazilians, follow me!") His display of courage stopped the retreat immediately; the units regrouped, and a vigorous attack led personally by Caxias overwhelmed the Paraguayan positions. Several men who were next to him during the attack were killed, as was his horse.

=== Aftermath ===
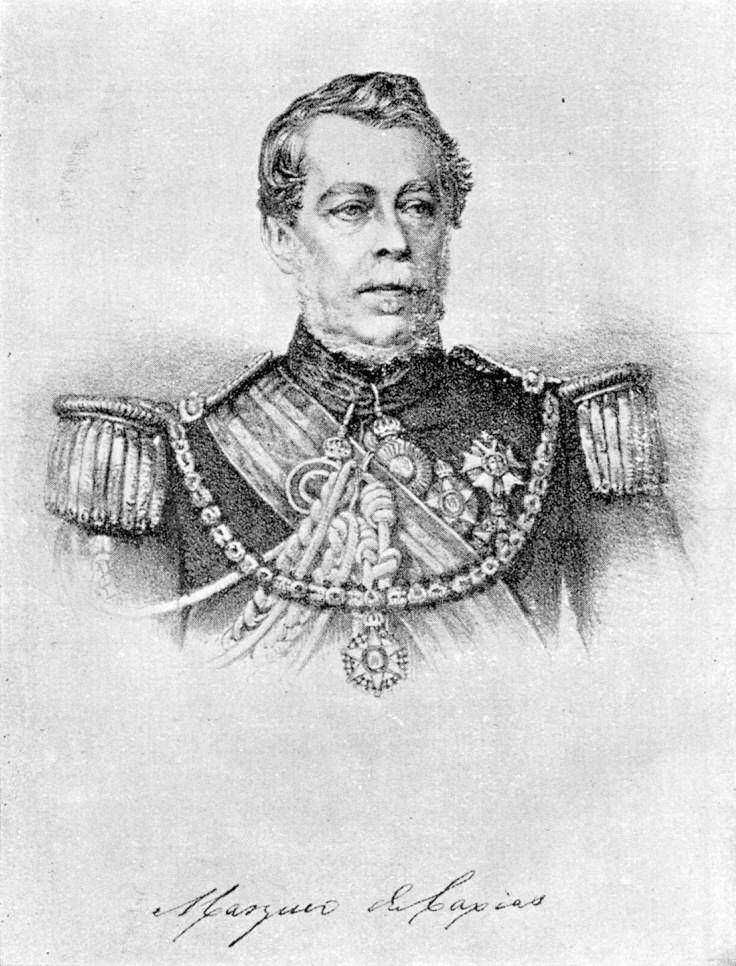
Caxias, around age 66, wearing the collar of the Order of the Rose, c. 1869

Caxias was growing old, and was ill and exhausted by the time he reached Asunción. As he did not feel up to the task of pursuing López into the Paraguayan hinterland, he asked to be either relieved of his post or given a short leave. Although his request was denied, he appointed a senior member of his staff as acting commander, and left for Brazil on 19 January 1869. The Emperor was angered that the marquis had left his post without permission, and especially that Caxias had declared the war to have been already won—even though López was still at large and regrouping his few remaining military assets. Caxias's ill-conceived decision seriously endangered the hard-won achievements of the past months, even as the objective of eliminating López as a threat remained tantalizingly within reach.

In early February the marquis arrived back unannounced at his house in Rio de Janeiro, much to the surprise of his wife. The Viscount of Inhaúma also returned home shortly afterwards, but with his health so compromised that he died a few weeks later. Upon learning of Inhaúma's death, Caxias said: "and the same would have had happened to me, had I not resolved to get out of that hell." Pedro II was greatly disappointed in Caxias, but he was also very aware that the marquis was the person most responsible for the great successes during the war, accomplishments that had come at the cost of years of sacrifice and personal bravery. The Emperor called the marquis to the Imperial Palace, the Paço de São Cristóvão, on 21 February 1869 for a reconciliation.

A few days later the Emperor awarded Caxias the Order of Pedro I and raised him from marquis to duke, the highest rank of Brazilian nobility, and a unique distinction during Pedro II's 58-year reign. The Emperor also appointed him to the Council of State in October 1870. But none of this prevented Caxias from attacks and accusations—some petty—in the parliament, including having left his post without permission. The embittered duke wrote to his friend Manuel Luís Osório, Marquis of Erval: "When I was young, my friend, I did not know how to explain why the elderly were selfish, but now that I am old, I see that they are like that because of the disappointments and ingratitudes they suffer during their lives. At least this is what happens to me".

== Later years ==
=== Figurehead presidency ===
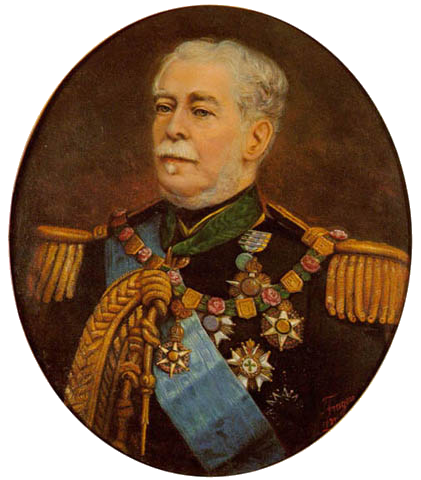
The Duke of Caxias at age 71, 1875

Paranhos, now Viscount of Rio Branco, led a cabinet from 1871 to 1875. Two serious crises arose that challenged its viability and undermined the foundations of the monarchy. The first resulted from the controversy over the Law of Free Birth, which Caxias voted for. The law was to emancipate children born to slave women after its enactment. With half of Conservative Party members supporting the bill and the other half staunchly opposed, a serious rift opened in the ranks. Opponents represented the interests of powerful coffee farmers such as Caxias, planters who had long been the main political, social, and economic supporters of the Conservative Party.

The second crisis was the Religious Issue, which developed after the government came into conflict with two bishops who had ordered that Freemasons be expelled from lay brotherhoods. The dispute grew out of proportion when both bishops were convicted and given prison sentences for disobeying the government's order to rescind their expulsions. As Catholicism was the state religion, the Emperor exercised, with the papacy's acquiescence, a great deal of control over church affairs—paying clerical salaries, appointing parish priests, nominating bishops, ratifying papal bulls, and overseeing seminaries. As a result of the furor over the handling of the affair, Rio Branco and his cabinet resigned, "disunited and weary after four years in office", according to historian Roderick J. Barman. Pedro II asked Caxias to form a new cabinet. The duke later gave a remarkable account of their meeting:

Believe that when I entered my carriage to go São Cristóvão, summoned by the Emperor, I was determined not to accept. But he, as soon as he saw me, embraced me and said to me that he would not let me go unless I told him that I would accept the post of minister and that, if I refused to do this service, he would summon the Liberals and would have to tell everybody that I was responsible for the consequence, all the while encircling me with his arms. I pointed out to him my circumstances, my age, and my infirmity; but he concurred in nothing. To free myself from him, I should have had to shove him off, and this I could not do. I bowed my head and said that I would do what he wanted but that I was sure that he would have cause for regret, since I would not be minister for long, because I would die from work and troubles. However, he listened to nothing and told me that I should only do what I could do but that I must not abandon him, since he would in that case abandon us and go away.

The elderly Caxias, almost 72 and widowed since 1874, was in poor health and could serve only as a figurehead president of the government formed on 25 June 1875. Cotejipe was the de facto president. The Caxias-Cotejipe cabinet attempted to dissipate the discord created by the previous cabinet. Their measures included financial aid to coffee farmers, an amnesty for the convicted bishops, and, to please the pro-slavery Conservatives, the selection of new ministers and a call for elections. Caxias, who was a Freemason but also a staunch Catholic, threatened to resign if the Emperor did not grant the amnesty, which Pedro II grudgingly issued in September 1875.

=== Death ===
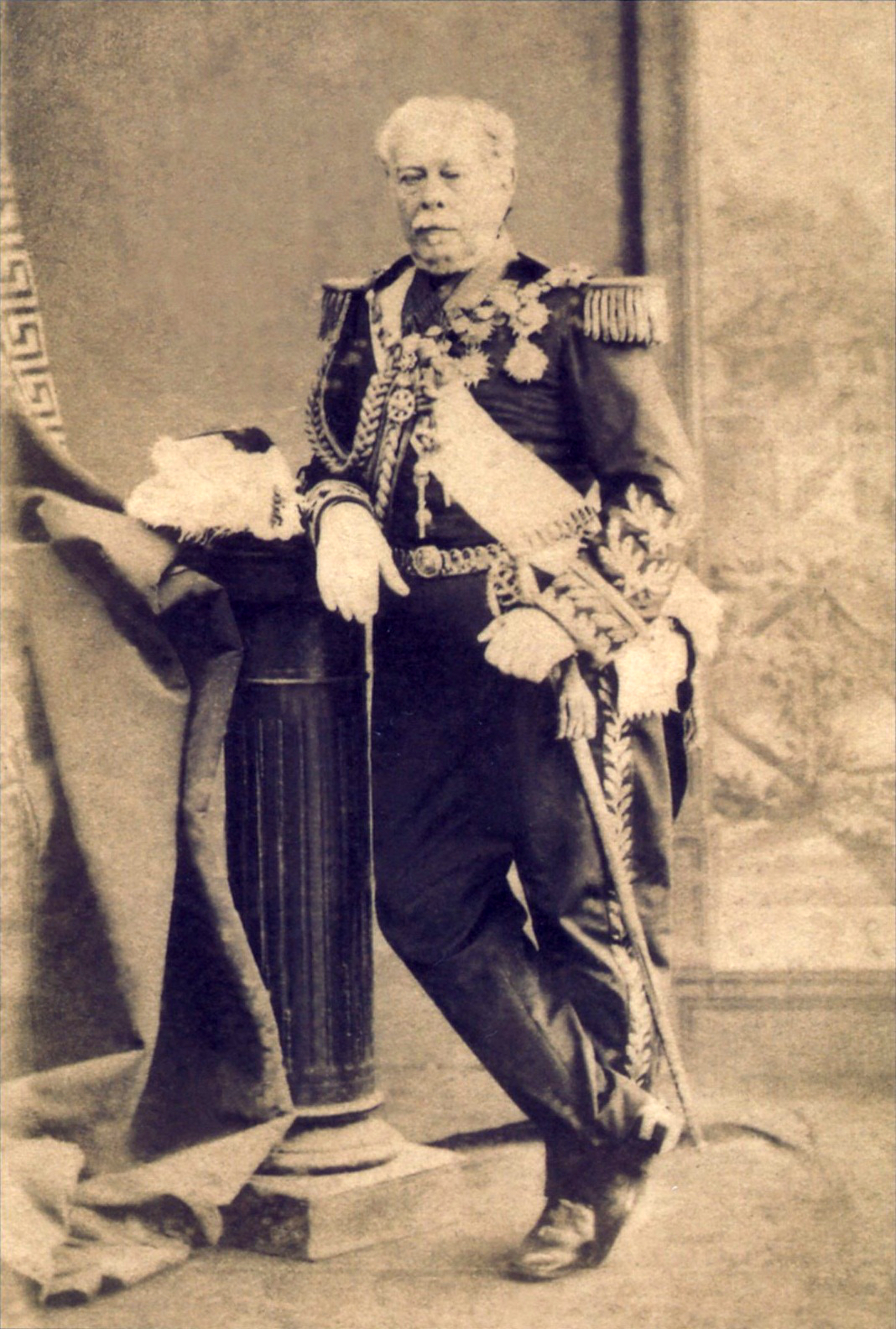
Caxias around age 74, c. 1877

At the end of 1877, Pedro II paid a visit to Caxias and ascertained that he could no longer remain in office. The entire cabinet resigned on 1 January 1878. His health problems had become so troubling that he had been asking repeatedly to resign since early 1876. Caxias was not only afflicted by concerns over his declining health, but increasingly felt a sense of alienation. He did not feel he could play a relevant role in politics. He belonged to an older generation who perceived the Emperor (and consequently, the monarchy) as essential for holding the nation together.

The new politicians who had begun to dominate the government had little memory of the times before Pedro II assumed control in 1840. Unlike their predecessors, they had no experience of the regency and the early years of Pedro II's reign, when external and internal dangers threatened the nation's existence; they had only known a stable administration and prosperity. The young politicians saw no reason to uphold and defend the imperial office as a unifying force beneficial to the nation. Times were changing fast, and Caxias was aware of the situation. He became increasingly nostalgic for the former times he had spent with his now-dead Conservative Party colleagues and held a pessimistic view of future political prospects. When Itaboraí—one of the last survivors of those Conservative leaders who had begun their careers during the 1830s—died in 1872, the duke wrote to a friend: "Who will replace him? I don't know, I cannot see ... The vacuum he left will not be filled, as it was not with Eusébio, Paraná, Uruguai, Manuel Felizardo and many others who helped us sustain this little church [i.e., the monarchy, his 'second faith'], which collapsed or almost collapsed on 7 April 1831."

Unable to walk as his health slowly declined, the Duke of Caxias lived his remaining days at Santa Mônica farm, located near the town of Valença, in the countryside of Rio de Janeiro province. On 7 May 1880 at 11 pm he quietly died, attended by members of his family. A saddened Pedro II (who visited Caxias several times during his long illness) remarked about his "friend of almost a half century", that he had "known him, and esteemed him since 1832. He was 76, almost 77 years old. And so we remain in this world." Caxias asked for a simple funeral, with no pomp, no honors, no invitations, and only six soldiers of good conduct to carry his coffin. His last wish was not entirely respected: Pedro II sent a carriage used for funerals of members of the imperial family only, to be followed by sixteen servants of the imperial household, and one corporal and thirteen, not six, soldiers of good conduct to carry his remains. A huge procession was followed by a funeral (attended by Pedro II) and his body was laid to rest in the São Francisco de Paula cemetery in the city of Rio de Janeiro.

== Legacy ==
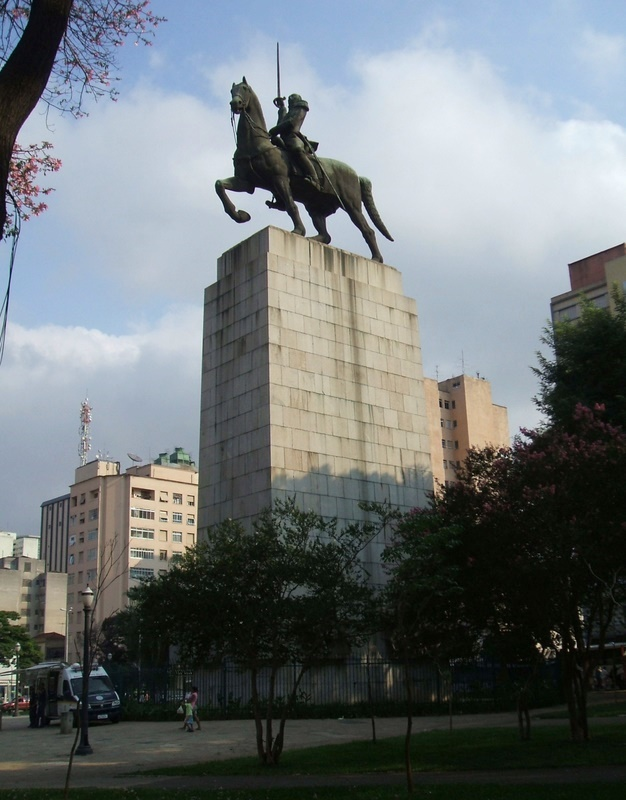
Monument in honor of the Duke of Caxias in the city of São Paulo

From his death in 1880 until the 1920s, the Duke of Caxias was not regarded as the most important military figure in Brazilian history. This honor belonged to Manuel Luís Osório, Marquis of Erval. Caxias was held to be a minor figure in comparison to Erval. His reputation slowly grew, and in 1923, the Ministry of the Army created an annual celebration in his honor. In 1925, his birthday officially became the "Day of the Soldier", which commemorates the Brazilian army. On 25 August 1949, his remains, along with those of his wife, were exhumed and reinterred in Rio de Janeiro's Duke of Caxias Pantheon. On 13 March 1962, Caxias became patrono (protector) of the army, making him the most important figure in its tradition. According to Adriana Barreto de Souza, Francisco Doratioto and Celso Castro, Caxias supplanted Osório because he was seen as a loyal and dutiful officer who could serve as a role model in a Brazilian republic plagued since its birth in 1889 by military insubordination, rebellions and coups. "His name", said the historian Thomas Whigham, "has become synonymous with the upright officer and citizen who never breaks the law—hence the popular term caxias, which refers to individuals who follow regulations without mistrust, doubt and evasion."

The historiography is often positive toward Caxias and several historians have ranked him as the greatest Brazilian military officer. (Note: The Marxist historiography constructed in Latin America during the 1960s and 1970s offered a stark contrast to the traditional view. Although largely discredited today, the revisionist historical narrative was taken up by many during those decades. The most serious novel allegation against Caxias was that, in a letter supposedly written by him during the Paraguayan War, he asserted that he had "deliberately spread cholera in Corrientes and other [Argentine] provinces hostile to the war effort by having infected corpses thrown into the rivers." Historians Hendrik Kraay, Thomas Whigham and Ricardo Salles have dismissed this allegation, as there is no proof that any such letter ever existed.) To historian Nelson Werneck Sodré, he was "not only the greatest military commander of his continent [South America], in his time, but [also] a great politician". Moreover, Caxias was "—more than D. Pedro II—the Empire." Francisco Doratioto said that the duke "in Paraguay had doubts, pride, resentment, and made mistakes; in short, he was a real character ... Caxias, however, was able to rise above his limitations, imposed on himself great personal sacrifices and incorporated the responsibility of accomplishing the objective ... In this context, Caxias was, indeed, a hero; he carried with him, it is true, social and political prejudices of his time, but one can not demand from the past the observance of present-day values."

Roderick J. Barman affirmed that Caxias was not only "extremely powerful in the Conservative party", but also "the country's most distinguished" and "most successful soldier", who had "proved his capacity and his loyalty by defeating revolts against the regime". C. H. Haring said that he was "a brilliant army officer", also "Brazil's most famous military figure" and a man "who was genuinely loyal to the throne". To Whigham, the duke was "destined to occupy a lofty spot in Brazil's national mythology. He often had to act as a statesman as much as military man" and was "[s]hrewdly competent in both roles". Hélio Viana regarded Caxias as "the greatest soldier of Brazil", a view shared by Eugênio Vilhena de Morais, Pedro Calmon, Octávio Tarquínio de Sousa, Antônio da Rocha Almeida and Gustavo Barroso.

== Titles and honors ==
Arms of the Duke of Caxias

=== Titles of nobility ===
- Baron of Caxias (without Greatness) on 18 July 1841.
- Count of Caxias on 25 March 1845.
- Marquis of Caxias on 26 June 1852.
- Duke of Caxias on 23 March 1869.

=== Other titles ===
- Member of the Brazilian Council of State.
- Member of the Brazilian Historic and Geographic Institute.
- Member of the Supreme Military and Justice Council.
- Emperor's aide-de-camp.
- Emperor's Veador (gentleman usher).

=== Honors ===
- Grand Cross of the Brazilian Order of the Southern Cross.
- Grand Cross of the Brazilian Order of the Rose.
- Grand Cross of the Brazilian Order of Pedro I.
- Grand Cross of the Brazilian Order of Saint Benedict of Aviz.
- Grand Cross of the Portuguese Order of the Immaculate Conception of Vila Viçosa.

=== Military honors ===
- Medal (oval) of the Independence War (Bahia).
- Medal of the army in the Oriental State of Uruguay in 1852.
- Commemorative medal of the surrender of the division of the army of Paraguay that occupied the village of Uruguaiana.
- Medal (oval) of bravery "to the bravest ones" (1867).
- Medal awarded to the army, armada and to civil servants in operations in the Paraguayan War (1870).

== See also ==
- List of generals of the Empire of Brazil

== Bibliography ==
- Almeida, Antônio da Rocha (1961). Vultos da pátria: os brasileiros mais ilustres de seu tempo (in Portuguese). Vol. 1. Rio de Janeiro: Globo.
- Azevedo, Moreira (1881). "O Duque de Caxias". Revista do Instituto Histórico e Geográfico Brasileiro (in Portuguese). 44. Rio de Janeiro: Imprensa Nacional.
- Barman, Roderick J. (1988). Brazil: The Forging of a Nation, 1798–1852. Stanford, California: Stanford University Press. ISBN 978-0-8047-1437-2.
- Barman, Roderick J. (1999). Citizen Emperor: Pedro II and the Making of Brazil, 1825–1891. Stanford, California: Stanford University Press. ISBN 978-0-8047-3510-0.
- Barroso, Gustavo (1936). "Caxias no Museu Histórico Nacional [Caxias in the National Historical Museum]". Revista Militar Brasileira (in Portuguese). 35. Rio de Janeiro: Imprensa Nacional.
- Bento, Cláudio Moreira (2003). Caxias e a unidade nacional (in Portuguese). Porto Alegre: Genesis. ISBN 978-85-87578-09-9.
- Calmon, Pedro (1975). História de D. Pedro II (in Portuguese). Vol. 1–5. Rio de Janeiro: José Olímpio.
- Cardoso, José Antonio dos Santos (1880). Almanak Administrativo, Mercantil e Industrial (Almanaque Laemmert) (in Portuguese). Rio de Janeiro: Eduardo & Henrique Laemmert.
- Carvalho, Afonso de (1976). Caxias (in Portuguese). Rio de Janeiro: Biblioteca do Exército.
- Castro, Celso (2002). A invenção do Exército brasileiro (in Portuguese). Rio de Janeiro: Jorge Zahar. ISBN 978-85-7110-682-6.
- Cohen, Saul B. (1998). "Caxias". The Columbia Gazetteer of the World. Vol. 1. New York: Columbia University Press. ISBN 0-231-11040-5.
- Doratioto, Francisco (2002). Maldita Guerra: Nova história da Guerra do Paraguai (in Portuguese). São Paulo: Companhia das Letras. ISBN 978-85-359-0224-2.
- Doratioto, Francisco (December 2003). "Senhor da guerra e da paz [Lord of the war and peace]". Nossa História (in Portuguese). Rio de Janeiro: Biblioteca Nacional. ISSN 1679-7221.
- Doratioto, Francisco (2008). General Osorio: a espada liberal do Império (in Portuguese). São Paulo: Companhia das Letras. ISBN 978-85-359-1200-5.
- Haring, Clarence H. (1969). Empire in Brazil: a New World Experiment with Monarchy. Cambridge, Massachusetts: Harvard University Press. OCLC 310545470.
- Kraay, Hendrik; Whigham, Thomas (2004). I die with my country: perspectives on the Paraguayan War, 1864–1870. Dexter, Michigan: Thomson-Shore. ISBN 978-0-8032-2762-0.
- Lira, Heitor (1977a). História de Dom Pedro II (1825–1891): Ascenção (1825–1870) (in Portuguese). Vol. 1. Belo Horizonte: Itatiaia.
- Lira, Heitor (1977b). História de Dom Pedro II (1825–1891): Fastígio (1870–1880) (in Portuguese). Vol. 2. Belo Horizonte: Itatiaia.
- Morais, Eugênio Vilhena de (2003). O Duque de Ferro: novos aspectos da figura de Caxias (in Portuguese). Rio de Janeiro: Biblioteca do Exército. ISBN 978-85-7011-329-0.
- Nabuco, Joaquim (1975). Um Estadista do Império (in Portuguese) (4th ed.). Rio de Janeiro: Nova Aguilar.
- Needell, Jeffrey D. (2006). The Party of Order: the Conservatives, the State, and Slavery in the Brazilian Monarchy, 1831–1871. Stanford, California: Stanford University Press. ISBN 978-0-8047-5369-2.
- Pinho, Wanderley (1936). "Caxias senador [Caxias as senator]". Revista Militar Brasileira (in Portuguese). 35. Rio de Janeiro: Imprensa Nacional.
- Pinto de Campos, Joaquim (1878). Vida do grande cidadão brasileiro Luís Alves de Lima e Silva, Barão, Conde, Marquês, Duque de Caxias, desde o seu nascimento em 1803 até 1878 (in Portuguese). Lisbon: Imprensa Nacional.
- Salles, Ricardo (2003). Guerra do Paraguai: memórias & imagens (in Portuguese). Rio de Janeiro: Edições Biblioteca Nacional. ISBN 978-85-333-0264-8.
- Scheina, Robert L. (2003). Latin America's Wars: The age of the caudillo, 1791–1899. Dulles, Virginia: Potomac Books. ISBN 978-1-57488-450-0.
- Siber, Eduard (1916). "Retrospecto da Guerra contra Rosas [Retrospect of the War against Rosas]". Revista do Instituto Histórico e Geográfico Brasileiro (in Portuguese). 78. Rio de Janeiro: Imprensa Nacional.
- Sodré, Nelson Werneck (2004). Panorama do Segundo Império (in Portuguese) (2 ed.). Rio de Janeiro: Graphia. ISBN 978-85-85277-21-5.
- Sousa, Octávio Tarquínio de (1972). Diogo Antônio Feijó (in Portuguese). Rio de Janeiro: José Olímpio.
- Souza, Adriana Barreto de (2008). Duque de Caxias: o homem por trás do monumento (in Portuguese). Rio de Janeiro: Civilização Brasileira. ISBN 978-85-200-0864-5.
- Vainfas, Ronaldo (2002). Dicionário do Brasil Imperial (in Portuguese). Rio de Janeiro: Objetiva. ISBN 978-85-7302-441-8.
- Viana, Hélio (1968). Vultos do Império (in Portuguese). São Paulo: Companhia Editora Nacional.
- Whigham, Thomas L. (2002). The Paraguayan War: Causes and early conduct. Vol. 1. Lincoln, Nebraska: University of Nebraska Press. ISBN 978-0-8032-4786-4.

Political offices
Preceded by Manuel Felizardo de Sousa e Melo	President of the Province of Maranhão; 1840–1841	Succeeded by João Antônio de Miranda
Preceded by Saturnino de Sousa e Oliveira Coutinho	President of the Province of Rio Grande do Sul; 1842–1846	Succeeded by Patrício José Correia da Câmara
Preceded by Pedro Ferreira de Oliveira	President of the Province of Rio Grande do Sul; 1851	Succeeded by Patrício José Correia da Câmara
Preceded by Honório Hermeto Carneiro Leão, Marquis of Paraná	President of the Council of Ministers; 3 September 1856 – 3 May 1857	Succeeded by Pedro de Araújo Lima, Marquis of Olinda
Preceded by Ângelo Moniz da Silva Ferraz, Baron of Uruguaiana	President of the Council of Ministers; 2 March 1861 – 24 May 1862	Succeeded by Zacarias de Góis e Vasconcelos
Preceded by José Paranhos, Viscount of Rio Branco	President of the Council of Ministers; 25 June 1875 – 5 January 1878	Succeeded by João Lins Cansanção, Viscount of Sinimbu
Preceded by Pedro de Alcântara Bellegarde	Minister of War; 14 June 1855 – 3 May 1857	Succeeded by Jerônimo Francisco Coelho
Preceded by Sebastião de Regos Barros	Minister of War; 2 March 1861 – 24 May 1862	Succeeded by Manuel Marques de Sousa, Count of Porto Alegre
Preceded by João José de Oliveira Junqueira	Minister of War; 25 June 1875 – 5 January 1878	Succeeded by Manuel Luís Osório, Marquis of Erval
