= Francisco Doratioto =

Brazilian academic

- Born: 1956 (age 69–70)

Academic background
- Education: University of São Paulo; University of Brasília

Francisco Fernando Monteoliva Doratioto (born 1956) is a Brazilian military historian who is a professor at the University of Brasília and the Rio Branco Institute.

His work focuses on the history of Brazil–Paraguay relations, especially on the Paraguayan War, and on Brazil's foreign policy in the Río de la Plata Basin as a whole.

== Biography ==
A descendant of Italians and Spaniards, he was born to Fernando Doratioto and Amélia Monteoliva Guillén in Atibaia.

He graduated in History and Social Sciences in 1979 and 1982, respectively, through the University of São Paulo's Faculty of Philosophy, Languages and Human Sciences. He has a master's degree and a PhD in History of International Relations by the University of Brasília. He was previously a professor of the Universidade Católica de Brasília and is currently a professor in American History at the University of Brasília's History Department.

In his most well known work, Maldita Guerra [Damned War], Doratioto presents the history of the Paraguayan War in detail, going against explanations which attributed to British imperialism a key role in fomenting the war. The work defends that well-prepared armed forces are a necessary tool for States to affirm their sovereignty, and that at the same time the involvement of military officers in politics is negative, for it tends to lead to neglect in the country's defense apparatus. In May 2020, Doratioto announced that this book would be republished in that year, in an expanded edition, in celebration of the 150 years of the end of the Paraguayan War.

He is a corresponding member of the Brazilian Historic and Geographic Institute, the Paraguayan Academy of History, the National Academy of History (of Argentina), and of the Brazilian Military Historic and Geographic Institute.

== Selected publications ==
- A Guerra do Paraguai Editora Brasiliense, 1990.
- A república bossa-nova - A democracia populista (1954-1964), written together with José Dantas Filho, Editora Atual, 1991.
- De Getúlio a Getúlio - o Brasil de Dutra e Vargas - 1945 a 1954 Editora Atual, 1991.
- O conflito com o Paraguai: a grande guerra do Brasil Editora Ática, 1996. Translated into Spanish, 2016.
- Maldita Guerra: nova história da Guerra do Paraguai Companhia das Letras, 2002. Translated into Spanish, 2004.
- General Osório: a espada Liberal do Império Companhia das Letras, 2008.
- Relações Brasil-Paraguai: afastamento, tensões e reaproximações, 1889-1954] Fundação Alexandre de Gusmão, 2008. Translated into Spanish, 2011.
- O Brasil no Rio da Prata, 1822-1994 Fundação Alexandre de Gusmão, 2014.
- História das Relações Internacionais do Brasil, written together with Carlos Eduardo Vidigal, Editora Saraiva, 2014.
- Memórias de Dorothée Duprat de Lasserre: relato de uma prisioneira na Guerra do Paraguai Editora Chão, 2023.
