= José Luís Mena Barreto =

Brazilian military officer (1817–1879)

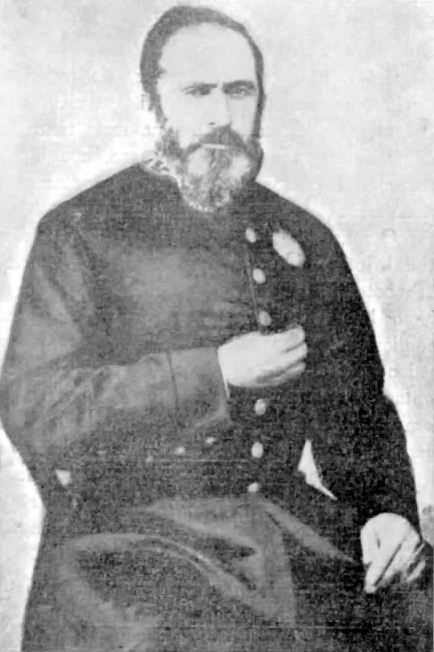
- José Luís Mena Barreto around age 49, c. 1866
- Born: 24 October 1817; Porto Alegre, Rio Grande do Sul, Kingdom of Brazil
- Died: 10 October 1879 (aged 61); Porto Alegre, Rio Grande do Sul, Empire of Brazil
- Spouse(s): Maria Francisca Mena Barreto; Rita de Cássia de Oliveira Melo
- Children: João de Deus Mena Barreto
- Military career
- Allegiance: Empire of Brazil
- Branch: Imperial Brazilian Army
- Service years: 1836–1879
- Rank: Field marshal
- Conflicts: Ragamuffin War; Platine War; Uruguayan War; Paraguayan War

José Luís Mena Barreto (24 October 1817 – 10 October 1879) was an army officer, politician and monarchist of the Empire of Brazil. He came from a wealthy family with a tradition of military service. José Luís entered the army in 1836, during the Ragamuffin War, a secessionist rebellion. The conflict lasted for almost ten years, and he fought in several military engagements at that time.

José Luís held several positions during the years following the end of the Ragamuffin threat in 1845. His most important posting was command over the cavalry unit that served as Emperor Dom Pedro II's personal guard in the national capital, Rio de Janeiro. He also fought against the Argentine Confederation in the brief Platine War, which lasted from 1851 until 1852. In 1864, he led one of the two divisions which comprised the Brazilian army in the Uruguayan War. During that conflict, he led the initial invasion of Uruguay and fought in two crucial engagements that resulted in the capture of two Uruguayan towns.

In the Paraguayan War, José Luís fought in most of its decisive campaigns. He was severely wounded during one battle and was left disfigured. Despite having served from 1864 until 1870 as a successful field commander, José Luís was repeatedly passed over in promotions and was not awarded a title of nobility. After the war, he held bureaucratic positions in military units before settling in the highly prestigious post of military commander of his native province, Rio Grande do Sul. He was also a politician and member of the Liberal Party. José Luís was seen by contemporaries and, after his death in 1879, by historians as a brave and able field commander.

== Early years ==
José Luís Mena Barreto was born on 24 October 1817 in Porto Alegre. The town was the capital of Rio Grande do Sul, a southern captaincy (later province) of the Kingdom of Brazil, which at that time was politically united with Portugal. His parents were José Luís Mena Barreto and Ana Emília da Silveira Sampaio. José Luís belonged to a wealthy family of Portuguese descent and military background, who owned ranches and large cattle herds. The family had a long history of participation in the colonial wars fought with Rio Grande do Sul's Hispanic-American neighbors.

In 1822, José Luís' family declared for Prince Dom Pedro (later Emperor Dom Pedro I), the leader in the struggle for Brazilian independence which eventually gave rise to the Empire of Brazil. In July 1823, José Luís' father, his uncle and his paternal grandfather (Field Marshal João de Deus Mena Barreto, later Viscount of São Gabriel), openly sided with Pedro I in his struggle with the Constituent and Legislative General Assembly that had been elected to draft a Constitution. The General Assembly punished the men by removing José Luís' father and uncle from their military commands and by ordering them to leave Rio Grande do Sul. His grandfather was barred from entering Porto Alegre.

José Luís' family did not fully comply with the orders. They settled in Rio Pardo, a town in Rio Grande do Sul. After Pedro I dissolved the Constituent Assembly in late 1823, the Emperor rewarded the Mena Barreto and lifted the penalties imposed upon them. Little more than a year later, the neighboring province of Cisplatina rebelled and attempted to secede from Brazil in what became the Cisplatine War. On 24 September 1825, José Luís' father died fighting against rebel forces during the Battle of Rincón, leaving him an orphan at age 7.

== Early military career ==
=== Ragamuffins rebellion ===
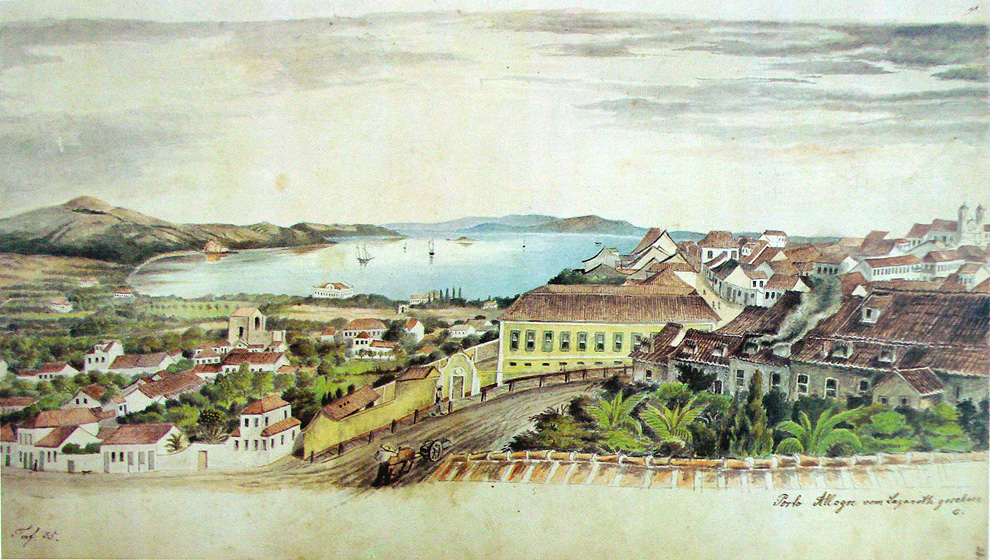
Porto Alegre, capital of Rio Grande do Sul province, seven years after the end of the Ragamuffin War

On 20 September 1835, a civil war that became known as the Ragamuffin War erupted in Rio Grande do Sul. The rebels, called Ragamuffins, conquered most of the province, including its capital, Porto Alegre. On 15 June 1836, Major Manuel Marques de Sousa (a loyalist officer, later made Count of Porto Alegre) retook Porto Alegre by surprise. Both soldiers and civilians participated in the town's recapture, and among these was the 18-year-old José Luís. Marques de Sousa handed over the command of the loyalist forces to José Luís' elderly grandfather, Army Marshal João de Deus Mena Barreto, the town's highest-ranking officer. José Luís joined the army as 1st Cadet in the 2nd Regiment of Light Cavalry.

José Luís fought in small battles on 30 June and 20 July against Ragamuffin forces besieging Porto Alegre, and he saw action again on 6 September near the town of Capela Grande (today's Viamão). In 1837, he fought in further engagements: on 10 January near the town of Rio Pardo and on 25 June and 29 September near Porto Alegre. He was promoted to alferes (modern-day second lieutenant) on 28 August 1838. On 2 December 1839, José Luís was transferred from the 2nd Regiment to the 3rd Regiment of Light Cavalry and raised to lieutenant (modern-day first lieutenant).

The imperial forces slowly regained ground, and by the early 1840s, the Ragamuffins were on the run. José Luís was promoted to brevet (acting) captain on 7 May 1842, and this commission was made permanent on 23 July 1844. After the war ended in March 1845, he was transferred to the 5th brigade and raised to major. On 23 December, he was moved to the 3rd brigade.

=== Platine War ===
In the years that followed, José Luís remained in the 3rd brigade. He was given a leave from 8 January 1848 until 8 May. He was next appointed to a bureaucratic position charged with administrative duties for the 4th Regiment of Light Cavalry on 23 May. José Luís received a promotion to brevet major on 30 August 1849. In January 1850, he marched to Bagé, and later to Quaraim, to maintain order after a series of disturbances broke out in those regions. Juan Manuel de Rosas, dictator of the Argentine Confederation, declared war on Brazil on 18 August 1851, beginning the Platine War. The government in Rio de Janeiro had prepared against the threat and formed an anti-Rosas alliance consisting of Brazil, Uruguay (former Cisplatina) and dissident Argentine provinces. A Brazilian army crossed into Uruguay in September 1851. The 4th Regiment was of Light Cavalry part of this expedition, serving under the 1st Division. The Brazilians were victorious, and José Luís was rewarded with confirmation in the rank of major on 19 June 1852.

On 15 July 1854, José Luís was promoted to lieutenant colonel and transferred to the 1st Cavalry Regiment, which served as Emperor Dom Pedro II's personal guard in the national capital, Rio de Janeiro. He became the regiment's interim commander from 22 February 1855 until 1 August. Upon leaving that position, he was praised by the Emperor for his organizing and leadership skills as head of the unit. José Luís requested permission to study in the Military College and take its cavalry course, but in February 1856, his request was declined. It was considered inappropriate to have a lieutenant colonel studying among cadets. José Luís was promoted to colonel on 2 December, receiving the command of the 4th Regiment of Light Cavalry, and was stationed to Rio Grande do Sul. On 14 March 1858, he was assigned command over the Jaguarão frontier (a military district in Rio Grande do Sul). On 3 July 1860, he was transferred to the command of the São Borja frontier, where he remained until 1862.

== Southern wars ==
=== Invasion of Uruguay ===
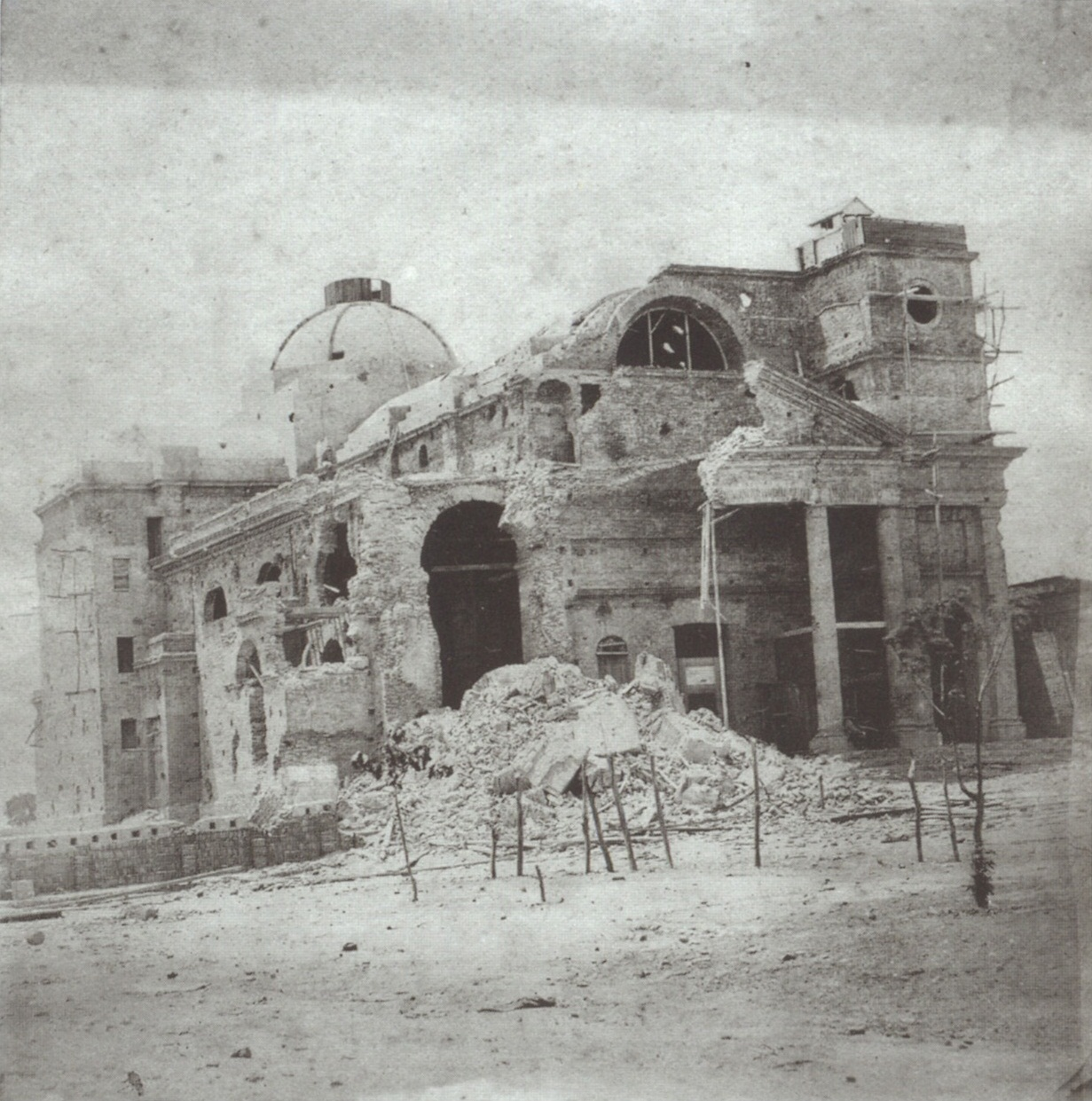
A church heavily damaged during the siege of Paysandú, 1865

On 15 February 1864, José Luís was given a four months leave to treat his health. He returned to active duty and was raised to the rank of brigadier on 29 July. A few months later, in October, he received orders to invade Uruguay at the head of a brigade composed of one infantry battalion and two cavalry corps. Another civil war had erupted in Uruguay between its Blanco Party and Colorado Party. The internal conflict led to the murder of Brazilians and the looting of their Uruguayan properties. The Brazilian government decided to intervene and mobilized an army. Brazil expected José Luís' small force to begin operations while its main army was being brought up to full strength.

José Luís' brigade began its advance on 12 October 1864. Two days later, near the Brazilian town of Jaguarão, the force invaded Uruguay's Cerro Largo Department. The Blancos attacked the Brazilian force during its march in several skirmishes, but was unable to prevent its progress. On 16 October, the brigade entered Melo unopposed. The town was the capital of Cerro Largo and had been abandoned by the Blancos. The brigade withdrew to rendezvous with the main army on 24 October, after handing over control of Melo to the Uruguayan Colorados. A few days previously, on 20 October, Brazil's Vice-Admiral Joaquim Marques Lisboa (then-Baron of Tamandaré) had formed a secret anti-Blancos alliance with Uruguay's Brigadier General Venancio Flores, leader of the Colorados.

On 1 November 1864, José Luís was appointed commander of the 2nd Division in the main Brazilian army, which by then was called the "Army of the South" and led by his uncle Field Marshal João Propício Mena Barreto (later Baron of São Gabriel). The Army of the South invaded Uruguay on 1 December. José Luís took part in the siege of the Uruguayan town of Paysandú, which fell on 2 January 1865. The Brazilian army and the allied Colorados force then besieged the Uruguayan capital, Montevideo. Before any attack upon the city could be launched, the Blancos capitulated, ending the conflict.

=== War against Paraguay ===
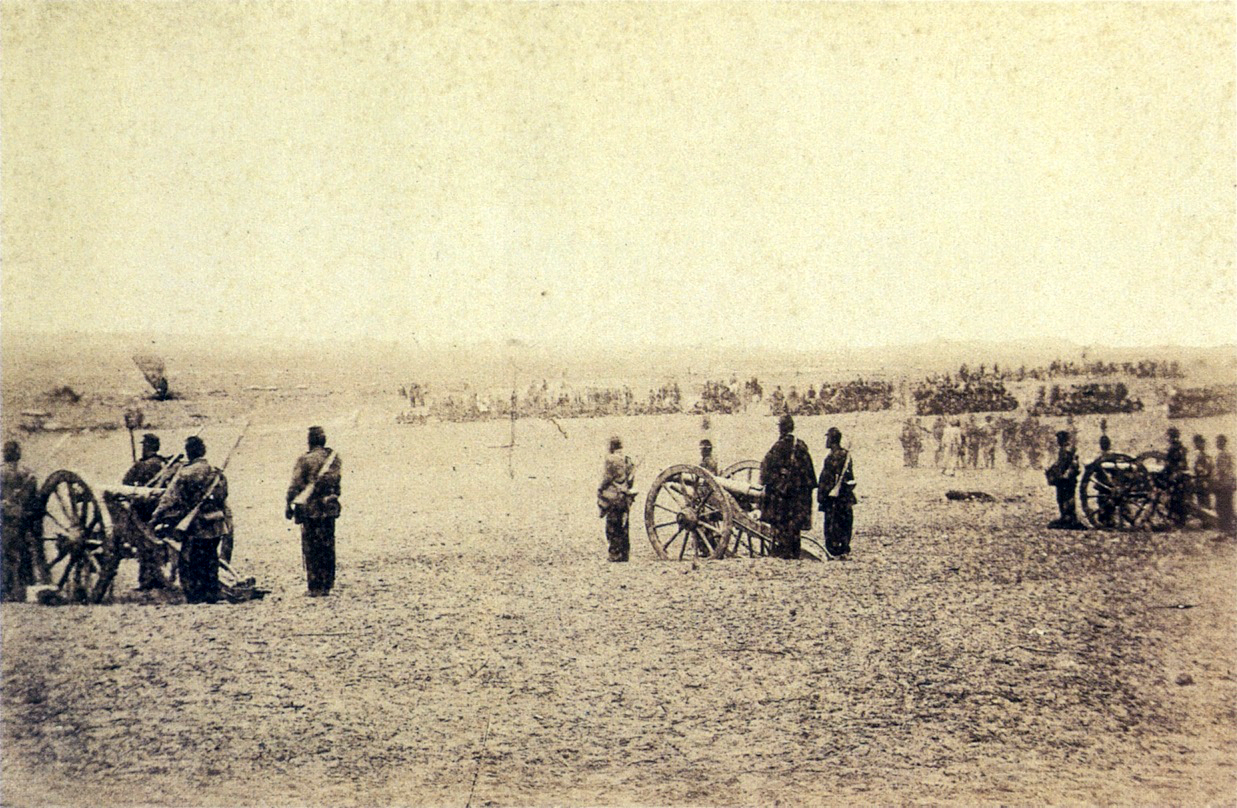
The Battle of Potrero Sauce, 18 July 1866

An unintended consequence of the attack on Melo was that Paraguay declared war on Brazil in late 1864. The Paraguayans invaded the provinces of Mato Grosso (present-day Mato Grosso do Sul) and Rio Grande do Sul. José Luís served in the Siege of Uruguaiana which resulted, in September 1865, in the surrender of an entire Paraguayan army which had taken the Brazilian town of Uruguaiana. On 22 March 1866, José Luís was given command of the 2nd cavalry division, a part of the 1st army corps. He fought in the Battle of Estero Bellaco on 2 May and in the First Battle of Tuyutí on 24 May. At Tuyutí José Luís was shot in the face with the bullet's trajectory entering one cheek and exiting through the other. He was left with hideous scars that made him look like he had a grim smile in his face. Tall and lean, José Luís seemed unpleasant at first glance, an impression that the disfigurement only worsened. He was actually a kind and warm person, according to historian Gustavo Barroso, who as commander knew how to impose a strict discipline without hurting the pride of his subordinates.

José Luís later fought in the Battle of Boquerón and the Battle of Potrero Sauce on 16 and 18 July 1866, respectively. He was transferred to the 1st cavalry division on 19 January 1867. He fought in the Battle of Tuyú Cué on 31 July, in the Battle of San Solano and in the Battle of Paré-Cué (part of the operations to encircle the Fortress of Humaitá) on 3 October. He was moved from the 1st cavalry division to the 3rd cavalry division on 12 October. He participated in the 28 Oct. 1867 Battle of Potrero Obella. He also fought in the Second Battle of Tuyutí on 3 November. After the fall of Humaitá in July 1868, José Luís took part in the Pikysyry maneuver that resulted in the Dezembrada (Deed of December), a series of decisive victories over the Paraguayans. At the head of the 2nd army corps after 6 December, José Luís fought in the Battle of Avay, in the Battle of Lomas Valentinas and in the Battle of Angostura.

Despite his having fought and gained victories in many battles from the war's outset, José Luís was not awarded with any promotion or title of nobility, except for receiving a few, minor chivalric orders. The Brazilian Commander-in-chief, Army Marshal Luís Alves de Lima e Silva (then-Marquis of Caxias), had a very low opinion of José Luís and considered him an incompetent officer. Caxias' view was not shared by other general officers, many of whom openly supported José Luís and praised him as a capable field commander. José Luís fared better under Caxias' successor, Prince Gaston, Count of Eu, who held him in high regard. During the last stage of the war, in which he commanded the 1st army corps, José Luís fought in the Battle of Piribebuy and in the Battle of Acosta Ñu in August 1869.

== Later years and death ==
On 10 April 1871, more than a year after the Paraguayan ended, José Luís was promoted to field marshal (present-day divisional general), the third-highest rank in the Brazilian army (below lieutenant general and army marshal). He was appointed on 24 April 1872 to the bureaucratic position of inspector of army units stationed in the provinces of São Paulo, Santa Catarina and Espírito Santo. On 27 August, he became the inspector of the army units in Rio Grande do Sul. José Luís remained in that position until 4 May 1878, when he was named military commander of Rio Grande do Sul, a highly prestigious post.

It is known that José Luís was also a member of the Liberal Party. It was common during the Empire of Brazil for high-ranking military officers to pursue political careers while on active duty. José Luís was first married to his cousin Maria Francisca Mena Barreto. After her death, he married Rita de Cássia de Oliveira Melo, with whom he had daughters and one son, João de Deus Mena Barreto (who as divisional general would play a key role in the Revolution of 1930 that led to the rise of Dictator Getúlio Vargas).

José Luís died in Porto Alegre on 10 October 1879, while still serving as military commander over his native province. He was given solemn funereal honors. Alfredo d'Escragnolle Taunay, Viscount of Taunay said that José Luís "had much bravery, beyond competence in arms" and was a good tactician who remained unshakably calm in battles. Historian Gustavo Barroso regarded him a valorous and brave officer, the member of the Mena Barreto family who had most distinguished himself through his own merits.

== Honors ==
=== Non-titled nobility honors ===
- Commander of the Brazilian Order of Christ.
- Commander of the Brazilian Order of the Rose.
- Dignitary of the Brazilian Order of the Southern Cross.
- Commander of the Brazilian Order of Saint Benedict of Aviz.

=== Military honors ===
- Medal of the army in the Oriental State of Uruguay in 1852.
- Medal of Paysandú.
- Commemorative medal of the surrender of the division of the army of Paraguay that occupied the village of Uruguaiana.
- Medal (oval) of merit "due to military bravery" (1868).
- Medal awarded to the army, armada and to civil servants in operations in the Paraguayan War (1870).

== See also ==
- List of generals of the Empire of Brazil

== Bibliography ==
- Almeida, Antônio da Rocha (1961). Vultos da pátria: os brasileiros mais ilustres de seu tempo (in Portuguese). Vol. 1. Rio de Janeiro: Globo.
- Bormann, José Bernardino (1907). A Campanha do Uruguay (1864–65) (in Portuguese). Rio de Janeiro: Imprensa Nacional.
- Barroso, Gustavo (1943). "Biografia do marechal de campo José Luiz Mena Barreto". Anais do Museu Histórico Nacional (in Portuguese). II (1941). Rio de Janeiro: Imprensa Nacional.
- Cardoso, José Antonio dos Santos (1879). Almanak Administrativo, Mercantil e Industrial (Almanaque Laemmert) (in Portuguese). Rio de Janeiro: Eduardo & Henrique Laemmert.
- Doratioto, Francisco (2002). Maldita Guerra: Nova história da Guerra do Paraguai (in Portuguese). São Paulo: Companhia das Letras. ISBN 978-85-359-0224-2.
- Menna Barreto, João Deus Noronha (1950). Os Menna Barreto: seis gerações de soldados, 1769–1950 (in Portuguese). Rio de Janeiro: Gráfica Laemmert.
- Silva, Alfredo Pretextato Maciel da (1906b). Os generais do exército brasileiro de 1822 a 1889: traços biográficos (in Portuguese). Vol. 2. Rio de Janeiro: M. Orosco & C.
- Tasso Fragoso, Augusto (2009). História da Guerra entre a Tríplice Aliança e o Paraguai (in Portuguese). Vol. 1 (3 ed.). Rio de Janeiro: Biblioteca do Exército.
- Taunay, Alfredo d'Escragnolle Taunay, Viscount of (2004). Memórias (in Portuguese). São Paulo: Iluminuras. ISBN 85-7321-220-9.
