= Émile Mallet, Baron of Itapevi =

French-Brazilian naval officer

Émile Mallet
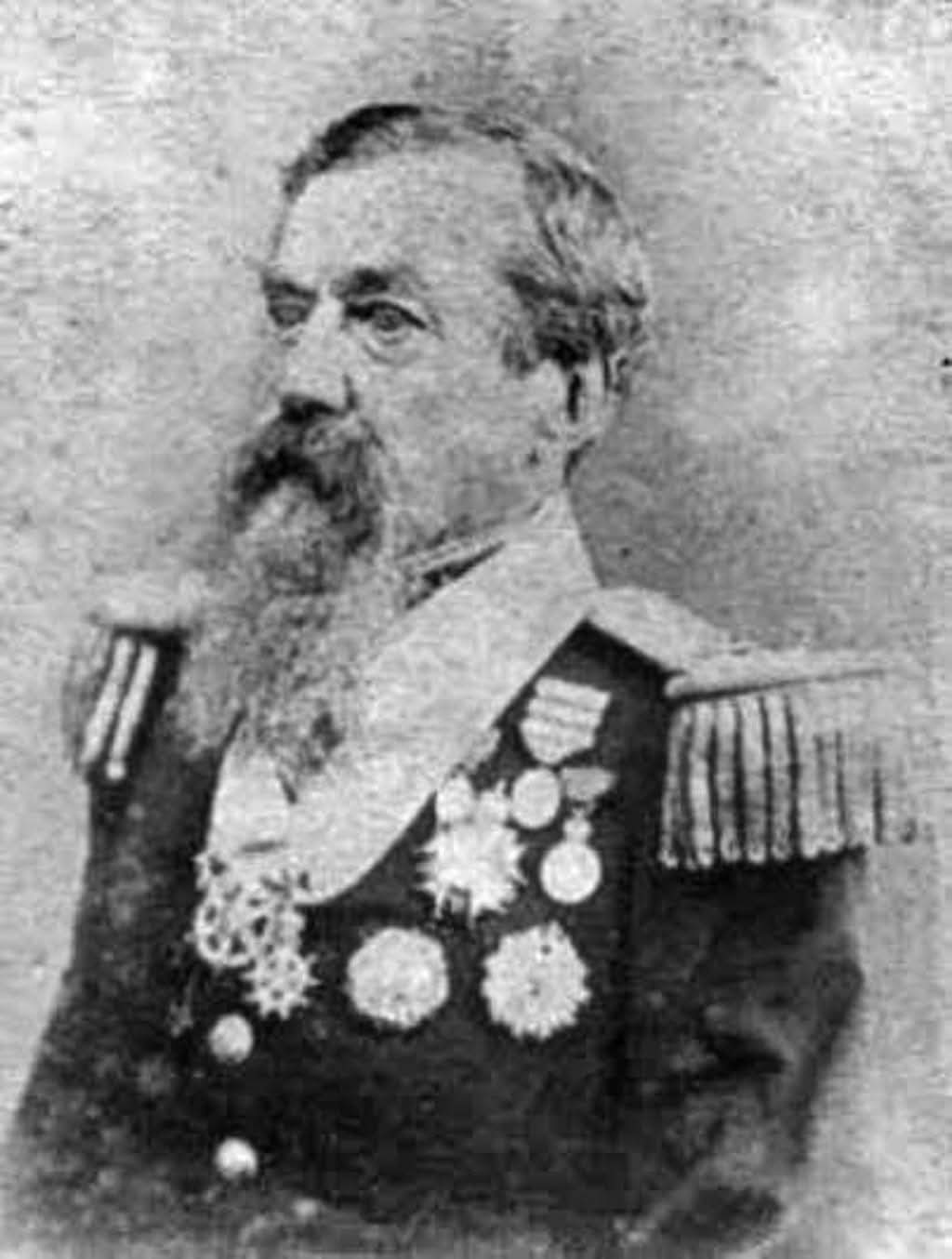

Personal details
- Born: 10 June 1801 Dunkirk, France
- Died: 2 January 1886 (aged 84) Rio de Janeiro, Brazil
- Resting place: Santa Maria, Rio Grande do Sul, Brazil
- Parents: Jean Antoine Mallet; Julie-Marie-Joseph Mallet
- Awards: Commander of the Order of Aviz; Dignitary of the Order of the Rose; Commander of the Order of Christ; Dignitary of the Imperial Order of the Cross

Military service
- Allegiance: Empire of Brazil
- Branch/service: Imperial Brazilian Army; Guarda Nacional
- Years of service: 1822–1831; 1837–1845; 1851–1885
- Rank: Marshal
- Commands: 1st Battery, 1st Mounted Artillery Corps; 1st Horse Artillery Regiment; 2nd Provisional Artillery Regiment; 1st Artillery Brigade; Army Artillery Command; Commander of Arms of Pernambuco; Commander of Arms of Rio Grande do Sul
- Battles/wars: Cisplatine War; Battle of Ituzaingó; Ragamuffin War; Platine War; Uruguayan War; Siege of Paysandu; Paraguayan War; Humaitá campaign; Battle of Paso de Patria; Battle of Estero Bellaco; Battle of Tuyutí; Siege of Humaitá; Pikysyry campaign; Pikysyry maneuver; Battle of Ytororó; Battle of Avay; Battle of Lomas Valentinas; Battle of Angostura; Campaign of the Hills; Battle of Piribebuy; Battle of Acosta Ñu

Émile Louis Mallet, Baron of Itapevi (10 June 1801 – 2 January 1886), was a French-Brazilian marshal. He is the patron of artillery in the Brazilian Army, the Day of the Artillery being celebrated on his birthday.

== Biography ==
=== Early life ===
Émile Mallet was born in Dunkirk, France, in 1801, to Jean Antoine Mallet and Julie-Marie-Joseph Mallet. Jean Antoine had come to the Americas as a young man, becoming a landowner in the French West Indies. In 1804, he lost his holdings in Hispaniola due to the Haitian Revolution; with the French wars with the United Kingdom, he lost investments he had in merchant ships.

A man of great physical bearing, at 2.01 m tall and weighing 120 kg, Émile Mallet came to Brazil with his family at age 17 in 1818, initially living in Rio de Janeiro. In the city, he was invited to join the Imperial Brazilian Army by Emperor Pedro I; he enrolled into the Imperial Royal Military Academy in 1823, where he joined the Artillery officer course. Previously, while in France, Mallet had concluded one year of studies in mathematics in the prestigious Saint-Cyr military academy, but he dropped out to accompany his family.

As a Second Lieutenant, Mallet commanded a battery of horse artillery in the Cisplatine War (the 1st Battery, 1st Mounted Artillery Corps), which lasted between 1825 and 1828. His first action was in the Battle of Ituzaingó, where he was promoted to captain, having commanded other gun crews after their officers were wounded. After the war's end, he married Joaquina Castorina de Medeiros Mallet in Bagé in Southern Brazil; she was the daughter of a wealthy landowner, and a close relative of Manuel Luís Osório, a friend and companion to Mallet and, in the future, also a Marshal in the Army.

Mallet was dismissed from service in 1831, due to not being natively Brazilian, and took up farming in Bagé. In 1837, however, as the Ragamuffin War raged, he was called back to service under General Antônio Elzeário de Miranda e Brito, as commander of a horse-drawn gun battery. He was later in charge of important fortifications in Rio Grande, and, afterwards, as Major of the National Guard, Chief of Staff for Bento Manuel Ribeiro. After peace was made with the signing of the Treaty of Ponche Verde in March 1845, Mallet went back to a rural life.

=== Service under Caxias ===
He rejoined the Army permanently in 1851, during the Platine War, when he was summoned by the then Count of Caxias to participate in the Campaign; he would remain in the Army until the Uruguayan War and the Paraguayan War started, fighting in both conflicts to their conclusion. In the conflict versus Uruguay, he commanded all the artillery in the key Siege of Paysandu. In the last conflict, initially in command of the 1st Horse Artillery Regiment, he had a key role in the victories of Paso de Patria, Estero Bellaco and Tuyutí.

Specifically in Tuyutí, the largest field battle in South American history, his guns were called "revolver cannons", both for their accuracy and firing speed. Mallet had ordered a deep trench to be stealthily dug in front of his cannons, impeding both infantry and cavalry charges against his position. He is famously quoted as having said "Eles que venham! Por aqui não passam!" [They may come! Through here they shan't pass!] as the battle started. Thanks to his performance in the battle, he was promoted to Colonel. Afterwards, as commander of the 1st Artillery Brigade, he continued to support allied forces in maneuvers such as the Passage of Humaitá and the Pikysyry maneuver, and battles such as Angostura, Ytororó, Avay, Lomas Valentinas, Piribebuy and Campo Grande. In Piribebuy, the killing of prisoners after the battle only stopped due to his orders.

During the final phase of the conflict, the Campaign of the Hills, Mallet was commander-in-chief for the Army's artillery, and promoted to Brigadier. After the war's end, he commanded troops in the border with Uruguay, and then was, briefly, commander of arms in Pernambuco, once again being sent to the southern border. In 1884 he was still promoted to Lieutenant General, and, in 1885, to Marshal; he had been ennobled as Baron of Itapevi in 1878. He died in 1886, in Rio de Janeiro, at 84 years old. His body lies in a mausoleum which is maintained by the "Mallet Regiment", as the 3rd Self-Propelled Campaign Artillery Group is called, in Santa Maria in Rio Grande do Sul.

== Honors and legacy ==
In March 1932 the Army created the Mallet Medal, which is granted to the officer cadets in the Agulhas Negras Military Academy who excel in the firing drills in the artillery officer course.

In Paraná, the city of Mallet owes its name to him; he is also mentioned in the city's hymn. In Curitiba, the state's capital, there is a Marechal Mallet street.

In São Paulo, in the neighborhood of Vila Zelina, there is a street named Marechal Mallet, and in the district of Guaianases there is a school named after him; in the state of São Paulo, in the city of Praia Grande, there is an Avenue Marechal Mallet, in the same neighborhood where Fort Itaipu is and where the 6th Coastal Motorized Artillery Group was based until 2004; nowadays the 2nd Anti-Air Artillery Group is based there. In Campinas, the Marechal Mallet State School is of great regional importance.

In Fortaleza, capital of Ceará, there is a square named after him.

His battle sword is in a museum in São Gabriel, where he lived for many years. One of the main thoroughfares of the city is named General Mallet. Also in Rio Grande do Sul, his dress sword is in a museum dedicated to him in Santa Maria. In Caxias do Sul, there is a General Mallet street; in Santana do Livramento, there is a Marechal Mallet avenue.

== Dates of rank ==
Insignia	Rank	Date	Component
	1st Cadet	13 November 1822	Imperial Brazilian Army
	2nd Lieutenant	12 October 1823	Imperial Brazilian Army
	1st Lieutenant	17 February 1825	Imperial Brazilian Army
	Captain	12 October 1827	Imperial Brazilian Army
	Captain	29 April 1831	Imperial Brazilian Army, retired
	Major	1837	Guarda Nacional
	Captain	1845	Imperial Brazilian Army, retired
	Captain	20 September 1851	Imperial Brazilian Army
	Major	2 December 1855	Imperial Brazilian Army
	Lieutenant Colonel	28 November 1863 (brevet); 22 January 1866 (permanent)	Imperial Brazilian Army
	Colonel	20 August 1866	Imperial Brazilian Army
	Brigadier	14 July 1869	Imperial Brazilian Army
	Field Marshal	18 January 1879	Imperial Brazilian Army
	Lieutenant General (temporary)	11 October 1884	Imperial Brazilian Army
	Lieutenant General	30 May 1885	Imperial Brazilian Army, retired
	Marshal	31 December 1885	Imperial Brazilian Army, retired

Military offices
Preceded by Brigadier Carlos Betbzé de Oliveira Nery	Commander of Arms of Pernambuco; 28 March 1872 – 12 June 1872	Succeeded by Colonel José Maria Ildefonso Jacomé da Veiga Pessoa e Mello
Preceded by Field Marshal Salustiano Jeronymo dos Reis	Commander of Arms of Rio Grande do Sul; 7 November 1879 – May 1880	Succeeded by Field Marshal Frederico Augusto de Mesquita
