= Tuiuti =

Tuiuti may refer to:

- Tuiuti, São Paulo, municipality in São Paulo, Brazil
- Paraíso do Tuiuti, a samba school in Rio de Janeiro, Brazil
- Tuyutí, marsh and pond in Paraguay
  - Battle of Tuyutí, 1867 battle of the Paraguayan War at Tuyutí
