= Antônio de Sampaio =

Brazilian general (1810-1866)

Patrono da Arma de Infantaria Antônio de Sampaio
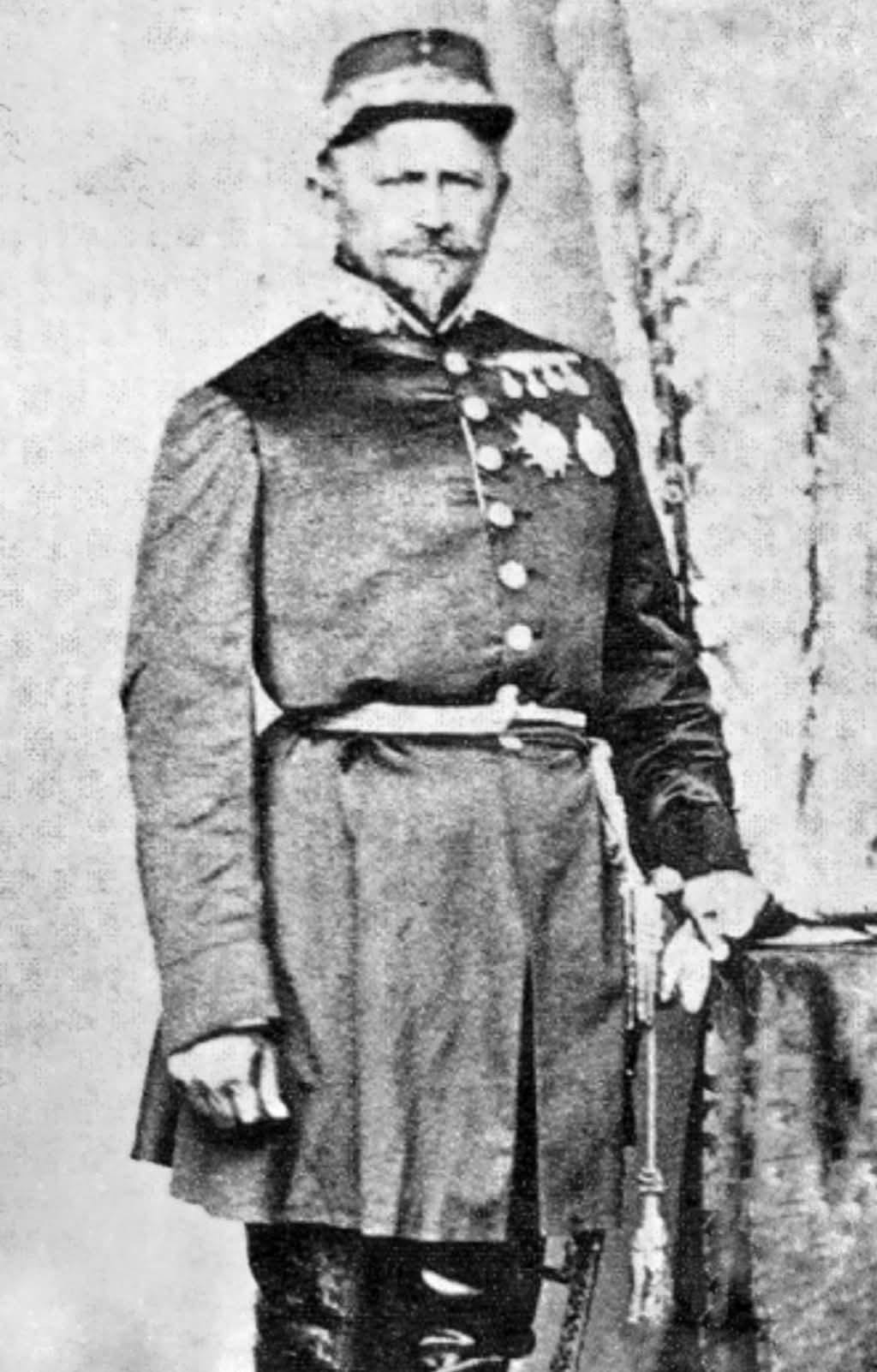
- Born: 24 May 1810; Tamboril, Ceará, Brazil, Portugal
- Died: 6 July 1866 (aged 56); Buenos Aires, Buenos Aires Province, Argentina
- Military career
- Allegiance: Empire of Brazil
- Branch: Imperial Brazilian Army
- Service years: 1830–1866
- Rank: Brigadier general Marshal (posthumously)
- Conflicts: Cabanagem; Balaiada; Ragamuffin War; Praieira revolt; Platine War; Battle of Caseros; Uruguayan War; Paraguayan War; Humaitá campaign; Battle of Confluência; Battle of Estero Bellaco; Battle of Tuyutí (DOW)
- Awards: Order of the Rose (Commander)

Antônio de Sampaio (24 May 1810 – 6 July 1866) was a Brazilian brigadier general and war hero, considered to be one of the finest generals during the 19th century. He participated in many rebellions and wars during his service but died from three wounds during the Battle of Tuyutí of the Paraguayan War. He was given the title of patrono da Arma de Infantaria (lit. 'patron of the Infantry Branch').

== Early military career and descendants ==
Antônio was born on "Fazenda Vitor" in Tamboril, 288 kilometers from Fortaleza. He was the son of Antônio Ferreira de Sampaio, who was a blacksmith and Antônia Xavier de Araújo. He had a normal youth like any young man from the countryside at the harshness of the northeastern backlands. At the age of 20, on 17 July 1830, he enlisted as a volunteer in the ranks of the then 22nd Battalion of Hunters, based in the Fortress of Nossa Senhora de Assunção, commissioned as an ensign on 20 May 1839, and being confirmed on 2 September 1839, and a lieutenant on 2 December 1839. He then participated in the Cabanagem and Balaiada revolts, as well as the Ragamuffin War. After being promoted to captain on 8 September 1843, he participated in the Praieira revolt. He was then promoted to major on 29 July 1852, after serving in the Battle of Caseros of the Platine War and promoted to lieutenant colonel on 2 December 1855.

He was then given command of the Police Corps of the Court of Rio de Janeiro and was promoted to colonel on 2 December 1861, and to brigadier general on 18 February 1865. His son, Olegário Antônio de Sampaio, was an infantry brigadier general in the Brazilian Army and played a prominent role in the repression of the Revolta da Armada and the War of Canudos. His grandson, Antônio Paiva de Sampaio, also pursued a military career, having distinguished roles in various conflicts in the first half of the 20th century, such as the São Paulo Revolt of 1924 and the Constitutionalist Revolution. Some descendants still reside in their hometown.

== Paraguayan War ==
At the head of the Imperial Army's 3rd Division, nicknamed the Encouraçada Division, composed of the legendary Arranca-Toco, Vanguardeiro and Treme-Terra battalions, he fought in the transposition operations of the Paraná River in the Battle of Confluência and in the Battle of Estero Bellaco. At the Battle of Tuyutí, considered the largest battle ever fought in South America, Sampaio was mortally wounded three times by grenade shrapnel in the right thigh and two in the back.

Evacuated from the battlefield, he died aboard the steamer Eponina while it was en route to Buenos Aires. His remains were initially buried there on 8 July 1866, but were eventually repatriated in 1869 to Rio de Janeiro, being reburied in the Church of Bom Jesus da Coluna, in the Asilo dos Inválidos da Pátria, where they remained until 14 November 1871, when they were transferred again to his home state, Ceará. Until 25 October 1873, his remains were deposited in the present Cathedral of Fortaleza, being buried in the "São João Batista Cemetery" at Fortaleza. On 24 May 1966, during the centenary of his death and the Battle of Tuyutí, his remains were removed to a mausoleum on Avenida Bezerra de Menezes in Fortaleza where they remained until 24 May 1996, when he was permanently buried in the Brigadeiro Sampaio Pantheon, erected in front of the Nossa Senhora da Assunção Fortress, headquarters of the 10th Military Region.

== Legacy ==
In 1900, a statue was erected at Praça Castro Carreira in Fortaleza, Ceará. In 1928, the students of the Aspiring Class of the Military School of Realengo, inspired by First Lieutenant Humberto de Alencar Castelo Branco, acclaimed him Patron of the Infantry of the Infantry Battalion of the aforementioned School. In 1940, the 1st Infantry Regiment, heir to the traditions of the Terço Velho de Mem de Sá, was nicknamed the "Sampaio Regiment". During World War II, when the Brazilian Blood Medal was instituted, destined to honor the wounded in action, the three enamelled stars in red symbolize the wounds of Brigadier General Sampaio, received in Tuyutí. He was then given the title of Patrono da Arma de Infantaria of the Brazilian Army in 1962. A group formed in 1981 at the Army Cadet Preparatory School was named the "Brigadeiro Sampaio Class". In 1996, the Brigadeiro Sampaio Pantheon was opened in Fortaleza in front of the Fortress of Nossa Senhora da Assunção, with the transfer of his remains to the site. The statue erected on 24 May 1900, was incorporated into the Pantheon, symbolically returning Sampaio to the barracks in which he had enlisted on 17 July 1830. By Law 11, No. 932 of 24 April 2009, his name was inscribed in the Steel Book of the Panteão da Pátria e da Liberdade Tancredo Neves, officially receiving the status of a National Hero. On 10 June 2011, the Academia Sulbrasileira de Medalhística (now the Academia Brasileira de Medalhística Civico Militar do Brasil creates the Brigadeiro Sampaio Medal. During the bicentennial of his birth, he was honored by the Brazilian Army by christening all the graduating classes, including the class of students who graduated from the Escola Preparatória de Cadetes do Exército in 2010 were known under the name Turma Bicentenário do Brigadeiro Sampaio. This class provided the EB with the aspiring officers graduated from the Academia Militar das Agulhas Negras in 2014.

On 30 July 2026, in the midst of a diplomatic crisis with Paraguay, Brazilian president Lula posthumously promoted him to the rank of marshal.
