= Ramona Martínez (nurse) =

Enslaved Paraguayan nurse

Ramona Martínez (fl. 19th century) was an enslaved Paraguayan nurse. She became a heroine in the Triple Alliance War and was described as "the American Joan of Arc".

== Biography ==
Little is known about the early life of Martínez, other than that she was enslaved by President Francisco Solano López. She is considered a heroine of the Battle of Itá Ybaté, during the Triple Alliance War. Martínez, who was aged either 15 or 22 according to differing accounts, was present at the battle, working as a nurse. When she witnessed the wounding of Major Francisco Ozuna, she was inspired to attack the enemy with a sword. This act persuaded her comrades and other wounded soldiers to rally and stop the advance of the Brazilians. As a result of her intervention and her fighting, the newspaper El Semanario nicknamed her "the American Joan of Arc".

== Legacy ==
A school in Itá Ybaté, Lambare, bears her name.

== Historiography ==
The role of women during the Triple Alliance War is one that has been historically overlooked. One of the first texts to refer to their involvement was El libro de los héroes. Páginas históricas de la Guerra del Paraguay, which, according to historian Carolina Alegre Benitez introduced women, including Martínez. She is also significant as she represents a number of enslaved people who fought in the war and whose lives have been overlooked by historians researching the war, alongside those of indigenous people.
