= Battle of Potrero Obella =

Part of the Paraguayan War

- Part of the Humaitá campaign
Date	October 28, 1867
Location	Potrero Obella, Paraguay
Result	Brazilian victory

Belligerents
Paraguay	Empire of Brazil

Commanders and leaders
José González	Mena Barreto

Strength
300 soldiers	5,000 soldiers

Casualties and losses
143 casualties, 56 captured	9 officers and 76 soldiers killed 23 officers and 287 soldiers wounded

The Battle of Potrero Obella was a battle between a Paraguayan Army of 300 against 5,000 Brazilians. Although the Paraguayans took heavy losses, they inflicted 395 casualties (85 killed, 310 wounded) on the Brazilians.

Brazilian Gen. Barreto was sent from Villa del Pillar to capture Tayi on the River Paraguay, and Potrero Ovello on 27 October 1867. This would enable a Brazilian blockade of the Paraguayan garrisons. After their defeat on 28 Oct., the surviving Paraguayans made their way back to Humaita.
