= Battle of Estero Rojas =

Part of the Paraguayan War

- Part of the Humaitá campaign
Date	September 24, 1867
Location	Estero Rojas, Paraguay
Result	Brazilian victory

Belligerents
Empire of Brazil	Paraguay

Commanders and leaders
Marques de Sousa; Albino de Carvalho; Vasco Alves	Vallois Rivarola

Strength
+3,500 soldiers	~1,200 soldiers

Casualties and losses
+250 casualties	Unknown

The Battle of Estero Rojas took place on 24 September 1867, when a Brazilian convoy, coming from Tuyutí to Tuju-Cuê, was attacked by Paraguayan troops under the command of Vallois Rivarola.

To a lesser extent, the Brazilian forces, under the command of general Albino de Carvalho, were saved by the arrival of general Manuel Marques de Sousa forces, who repelled the Paraguayans.
