= Tamboril, Ceará =

Municipality in Ceará, Brazil

Coordinates: 4.83194°S 40.3208°W

Tamboril
- Municipality
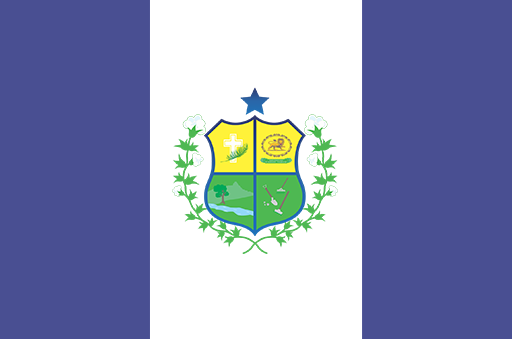
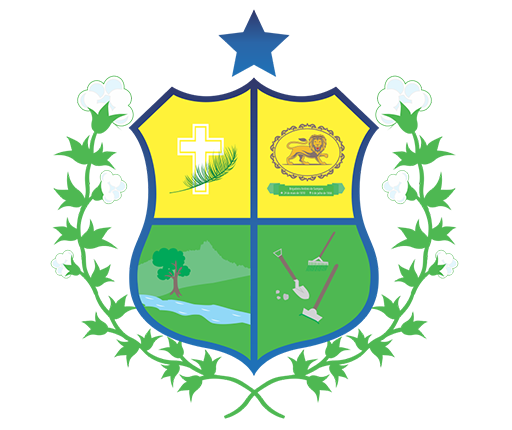
- Flag Coat of arms
- Interactive map of Tamboril
- Country: Brazil
- Region: Nordeste
- State: Ceará
- Mesoregion: Sertoes Cearenses

Population (2020)
  - Total: 26,225
- Time zone: UTC−3 (BRT)

Tamboril, Ceará is a municipality in the state of Ceará in the Northeast region of Brazil. It has an area of about 2046.6 km^{2}, and is located at a latitude of 04º49'56" South and longitude 40º19'14" West, at an altitude of 322 meters. The estimated population of Tamboril in 2020 was 26,225.

Tamboril contains 8 districts:

- Boa Esperança
- Carvalho
- Curatis
- Holanda
- Oliveiras
- Sucesso
- Açudinho
- Tamboril (Main district)

Tamboril is about 54 kilometers away from the municipality of Crateús, the regional capital of Ceará.

== See also ==
- List of municipalities in Ceará
