= Battle of Lomas Valentinas =

1868 battle of the Paraguayan War

- Part of the Pikysyry campaign
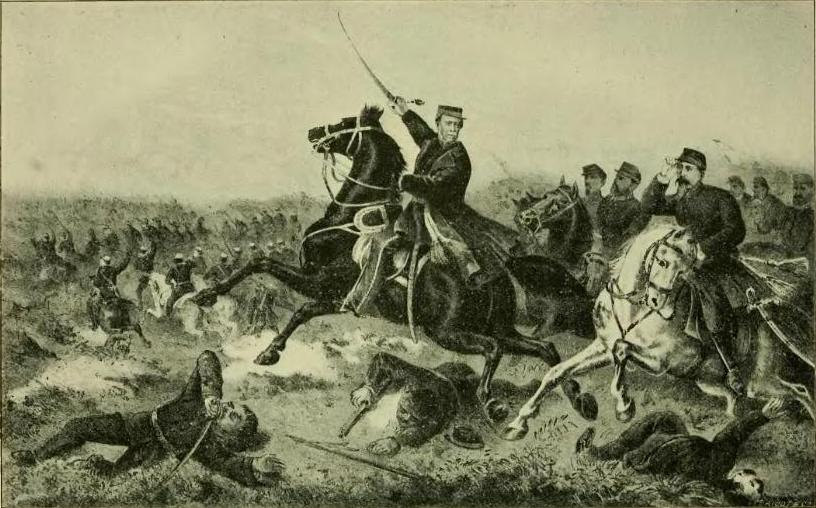
- The Marquess of Caxias leading the troops in Lomas Valentinas
Date	December 21–27, 1868
Location	Itá Ybaté, Central Department, Paraguay 25°35′29″S 57°31′3″W
Result	Allied victory

Belligerents
Paraguay	Empire of Brazil; Argentina; Uruguay

Commanders and leaders
Francisco López; Francisco Resquín; Bernardino Caballero	Luis de Silva; José Barreto; Jacinto Bittencourt; Joaquim Neves (WIA)

Strength
10,000	19,415

Casualties and losses
3,000; 1,500 killed 1,500 captured	3,270: Argentina: 64 killed and 283 wounded Brazil: 382 killed and 2,461 wounded Uruguay: 80 casualties

The Battle of Lomas Valentinas (also known as the Battle of Itá Ybaté) was fought in the Central Department of Paraguay on December 21–27, 1868. The Paraguayan Army, led personally by president Francisco Solano López, was decisively defeated, though López managed to escape. On 30 December 1868, the Paraguayan garrison at Angostura, with 1,907 men, surrendered to the Allies.

== Battle ==
Marshal Caxias had left Villeta at 02:00 on the 21st, and was ready to storm the Lomas Valentinas range by noon. Two columns of infantry, one under general José Luís Mena Barreto attacking the western defenses at Itá Ybaté, and another under general Jacinto Machado de Bittencourt aided by cavalry under general Andrade Neves attacking the northern defenses at Loma Acosta, where the hill of Cumbarity was located. The hill was taken by sundown.

On December 22, Argentine and Uruguayan troops advanced towards Lomas Auxilio. Marshal Caxias spent the 23rd reorganizing his battalions. On the 24th, Caxias demanded the surrender of López, which he refused. The Allied assault commenced again with dawn on the 25th and the 26th. The Paraguayan defenses were finally taken on the 27th.

== Women ==
Nurse Ramona Martínez was enslaved by López, but due to her work fighting and encouraging troops at the battle, became known as "the American Joan of Arc".

== Aftermath ==
López made his escape with the Aca Vera cavalry acting as his escort. Generals Resquín and Bernardino Caballero also escaped. This meant the war would continue.

== Gallery ==
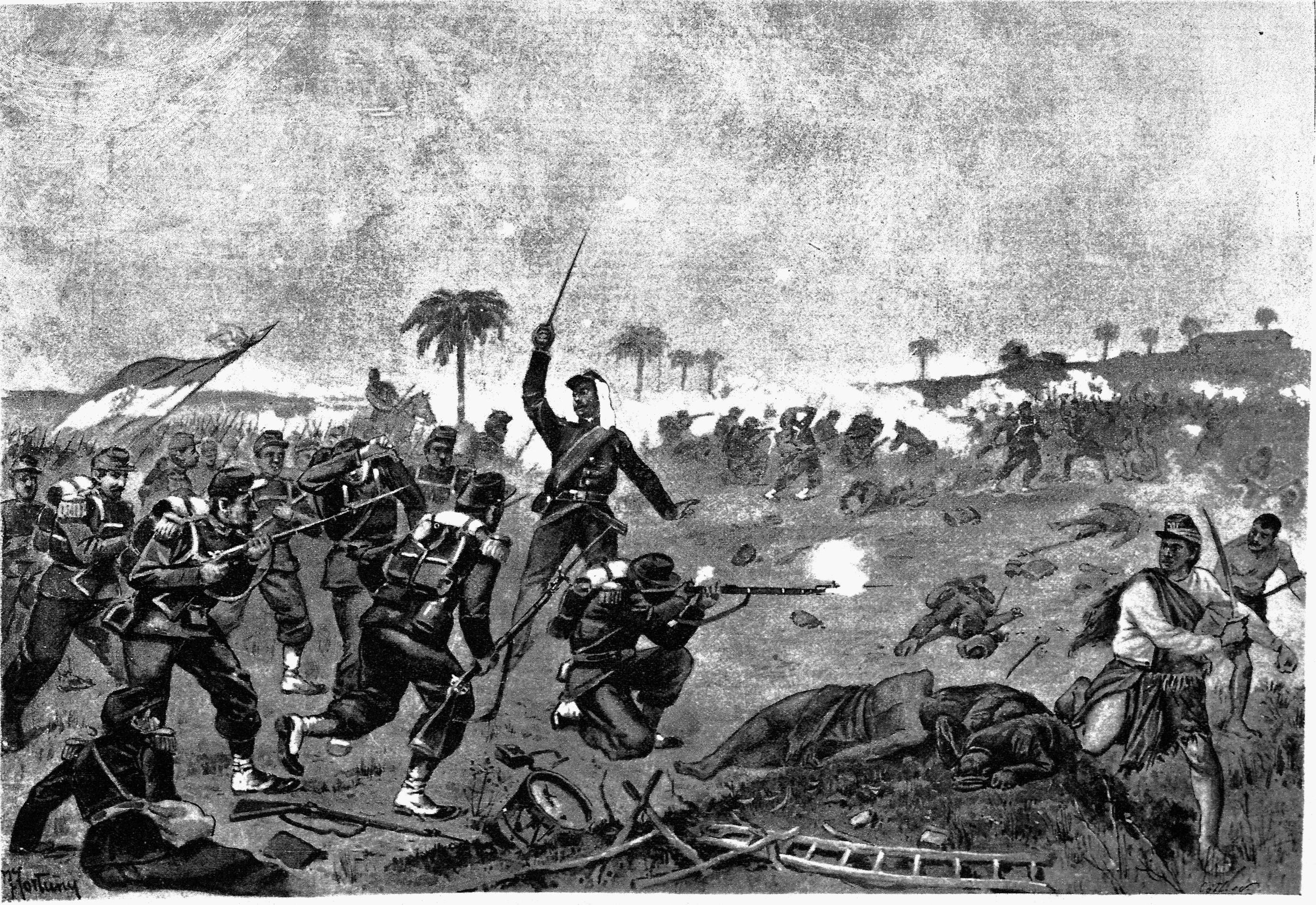
Charge of the Argentine infantary at Lomas Valentinas
