= Battle of Tuyutí =

Part of the Paraguayan War

Coordinates: 27°12′16″S 58°32′53″W

- Part of the Humaitá campaign
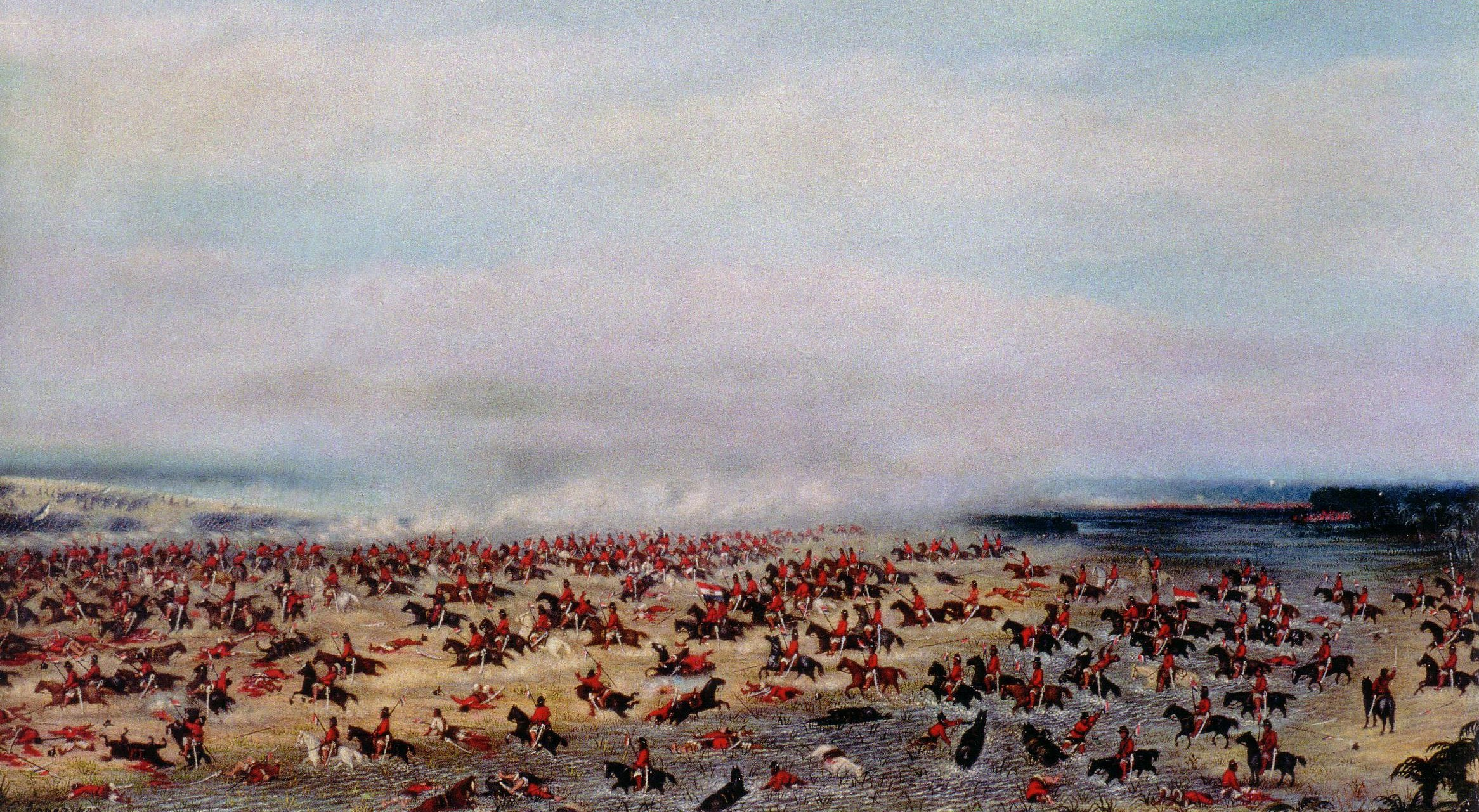
- Paraguayan cavalry, painting by Cándido López
Date	May 24, 1866
Location	Tuyutí, a few miles north of Paraná River
Result	Allied victory: Paraguayan attack repelled

Belligerents
Paraguay	Empire of Brazil; Argentina; Uruguay

Commanders and leaders
José E. Díaz; Isidoro Resquín; Vicente Barrios; Hilario Marcó; José María Bruguez	Manuel Luis Osório; Émile Mallet; Antônio de Sampaio; Bartolomé Mitre; Venancio Flores

Units involved
(Paraguay) Paraguayan Army	Imperial Brazilian Army; Argentine Army; National Army of Uruguay

Strength
26,000 soldiers	35,000: 22,000 Brazilians; 11,800 Argentines; 1,200 Uruguayans

Casualties and losses
13,000: 6,000 killed 7,000 wounded	4,248: 996 killed 3,232 wounded

The Battle of Tuyutí (Tuiuti in Portuguese) was a Paraguayan offensive in the Paraguayan War targeting the Triple Alliance encampment of Tuyutí. It is considered to be the bloodiest battle ever in South America. The result of the battle was an Allied victory, which added to the Paraguayan troubles after the loss of its fleet in the Battle of Riachuelo.

This battle is particularly important in Brazil, being nicknamed "A Batalha dos Patronos" (The Battle of the Patrons) since the Army's patrons of the Infantry, Cavalry and Artillery fought in it. The Battle of Tuyutí also marks the Brazilian Army's Infantry Day due to the loss of brigadier general Antônio de Sampaio (known as Brigadeiro Sampaio), patron of the Infantry, while holding his position at the head of his Divisão Encouraçada (Ironclad Division, the 3rd Division).

Another Paraguayan attack on the Allied camp was repelled in November 1867.

== Preliminaries ==
In early May 1866, the Paraguayan assault at the Estero Bellaco marsh failed. The allies camped for over two weeks before resuming their advance on 20 May 1866. Paraguayan leader Francisco Solano López moved his headquarters to Paso Pucu, where he dug trenches in the passes from Gomez to Rojas. After learning that the allies were planning to attack on the 25th, López ordered a surprise attack on Tuyutí, "a swampy, scrub-brush savannah", for the 24th. The 24 May 1866 battle of Tuyutí is known as the First Battle of Tuyutí; the second Battle of Tuyutí occurred on 7 November 1867.

== Battle ==
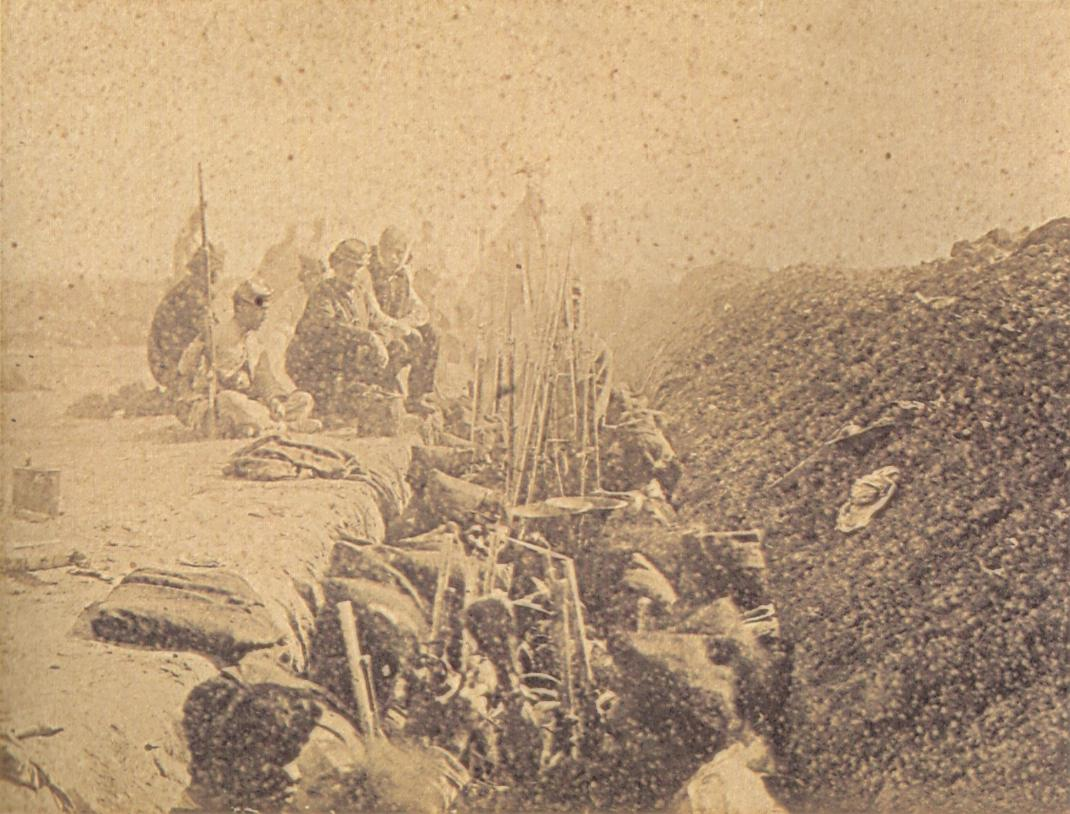
Trench with Uruguayan soldiers from the 24 April Battalion at Tuyutí, taken a month after the battle. Albumen print, 1866.

The Paraguayans attacked in three columns at 11:55 after a Congreve rocket signaled the attack. General Vicente Barrios, with 8,000 infantry and 1,000 cavalry, attacked the Allied left, which were Brazilians under the command of general Osório. General Isidoro Resquín, with 7,000 cavalry and 3,000 infantry attacked the Allied right flank. Colonel José Eduvigis Díaz, with 6,000 infantry and 1,000 cavalry, attacked the Allied center, general Flores' Vanguard Division. Colonel Hilario Marcó, with 7,000 men and 48 cannons, formed the reserve at Estero Rojas

The attack began in the center, where the Uruguayans were forced back along with some Brazilian Volunteer battalions. On the left of the Allied encampment, lieutenant-colonel Émile Mallet had ordered a large moat to stealthily be dug in front of his artillery pieces, which were thirty La Hitte cannons, according to one source. When the Paraguayan onslaught reached it, they were in grapeshot range and unable to cross the obstacle. The Paraguayans tried to circle the artillery, avoiding the incoming fire, but encountered Antônio Sampaio's 3rd Infantry Division. Sampaio, shouted, "Fogo, Batalhão!" (Open fire, Battalion!). This unit fought desperately in the muddy terrain though their commander died in the process. At this point, Osório ordered his reserves to attack and they managed to repel the Paraguayan center.

Mallet's hidden ditch, the Fosso de Mallet, was the inspiration for Mallet's famous battle cry, "Eles que venham. Por aqui não passarão" ("Let them come. They won't pass through here"). Mallet's cannons were dubbed "artilharia revólver" (revolver artillery), such was the precision and speed of their firing.

On the allied left, the Paraguayans forced back the few Brazilian units, almost reaching the Allied camp. Osório reinforced the Brazilian lines with various units, finally committing the 2nd Cavalry Division, commanded by general João Manuel Mena Barreto. The Paraguayans continued to attack until they were encircled and annihilated. In the Argentine sector, the Paraguayan cavalry under general Resquín routed the Argentine cavalry under generals Cáceres and Hornos.

Soon the battle turned into "a series of charges and countercharges, a Latin American version of Waterloo". The Paraguayan columns continued to attack, but could not overcome the allied firepower. In the words of colonel George Thompson of the Paraguayan army (a veteran of the battle), "at 4 p.m. the firing was over, the Paraguayans being completely defeated, and their army destroyed. The Allies had suffered severely also, but they still had an army left. The Paraguayans left 6,000 dead on the field; the Allies only took some 350 prisoners, all wounded. This was because the Paraguayans would never surrender but, when wounded, fought on till they were killed. 7,000 wounded were taken into the Paraguayan hospitals from this battle, those with slight wounds not going into hospital at all... The Allies lost above 8,000 killed and wounded."

== Aftermath ==
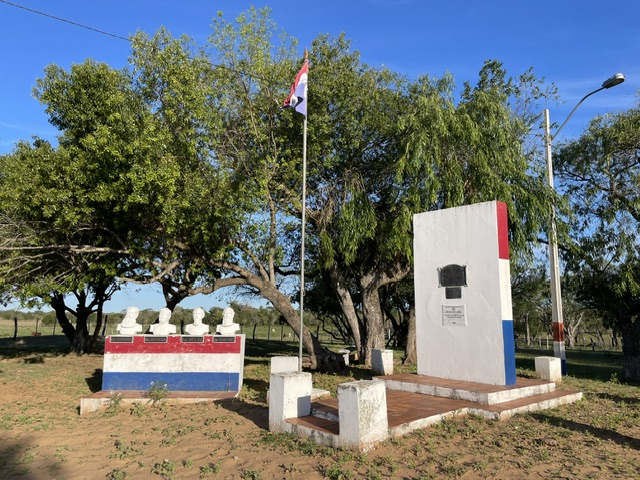
Monument at the site of the battle in 2025.

As result of the battle, each side's losses were as follows:

	Killed	Wounded	Total casualties
Paraguayans	6000	7000	13000
Allies	996	3252	4248
Argentinians	126	480	606
Brazilians	737	2292	3029
Uruguayans	133	480	613
Sources: Adib Murad, A batalha de Tuiuti e uma lição de civismo, Rio de Janeiro, Biblioteca do Exército, 1957, p. 23; Augusto Tasso Fragoso, História da Guerra entre a Tríplice Aliança e o Paraguai, Rio de Janeiro, Imprensa do Estado-Maior do Exército, 1934-5, vol. II, p. 459

There have been contradictory reports about the casualty numbers and debates over the true values. Centurión, reported that Paraguayan dead numbered about 5,000, maybe more, and the wounded 7,000, while the allies lost 8,000 killed and wounded. Thompson agreed with the number of Paraguayan wounded, but claimed that 6,000 were killed. Other authors give different numbers: in Barreto's opinion 6,500 Paraguayans were killed, while allied casualties were 3,647, with 3,011 Brazilians. According to Silva Pimentel 7,000 Paraguayans were killed. Rawson and Beverina also declared that 7,000 Paraguayans were killed along with "so many others wounded", while the allied casualties were 4,000. Osório's Order of the Day affirmed that the Paraguayan dead numbered "more" than 3,000, with 200 wounded and 21 prisoners; according to this document, Brazilian casualties were 412 killed and 2,003 wounded.

Tuyutí was the last major Paraguayan attack. Ultimately, it was a devastating Paraguayan defeat. "The 10,000 men who had not been killed or [seriously] wounded were completely scattered and disorganised, and it was some days before they were again collected", wrote Thompson. "The Allies buried some of their own dead, but they heaped up the Paraguayan corpses in alternate layers with wood, in piles of 50 to 100, and burnt them. They complained that the Paraguayans were so lean they that they would not burn".

The largest battle ever fought in South America was over. Lopéz's flanking maneuver had failed, but it had come very close to succeeding. In fact, the Allies were unable to pursue the enemy, since they had few horses remaining. They needed to regain strength and rebuild.

The Allied forces stayed in their camp until September, but disease struck the camp, claiming some 10,000 victims. Even after September, advances were little and the allied lines settled down to await further orders. These months of static warfare were filled with small-scale skirmishes and sporadic fire, being known in the Allied forces as the "Tuyutí Black Lines".

The Brazilian Army's Patrons of the Infantry (Antônio de Sampaio), Cavalry (Manuel Luís Osório) and Artillery (Émile Mallet) fought in Tuyutí.
