= Battle of Angostura (1868) =

Battle of the Paraguayan War

- Part of the Pikysyry campaign
Date	30 December 1868
Location	Pikysyry stream, Angostura Fortress, Paraguay
Result	Brazilian victory

Belligerents
Empire of Brazil	Paraguay

Commanders and leaders
Marquess of Caxias	George Thompson (surrendered)

Strength
21,000+ soldiers	2,000 soldiers

Casualties and losses
Unknown	Surrender of all soldiers

The Angostura Fortress was a Paraguayan Army fortification, located by the Pikysyry stream (a tributary of the Paraguay river), in Paraguayan territory. The Paraguayan War,^{[A]} (also known as the War of the Triple Alliance^{[B]} and the Great War^{[4][C]} in Paraguay), was a South American war fought from 1864 to 1870 between Paraguay and the Triple Alliance nations (Argentina, the Empire of Brazil, and Uruguay). Angostura Fortress was a battery of Paraguayan defense line fortifications strategically located along Lomas Valentinas. The Paraguayan units surrendered the fortification on 27 December 1868, which were then occupied by Imperial Brazilian Army forces on 30 December 1868. This led to a series of victorious battles won by Triple Alliance armies (also known as December Campaigns).
