= Second Battle of Tuyutí =

Part of the Paraguayan War

- Part of the Humaitá campaign
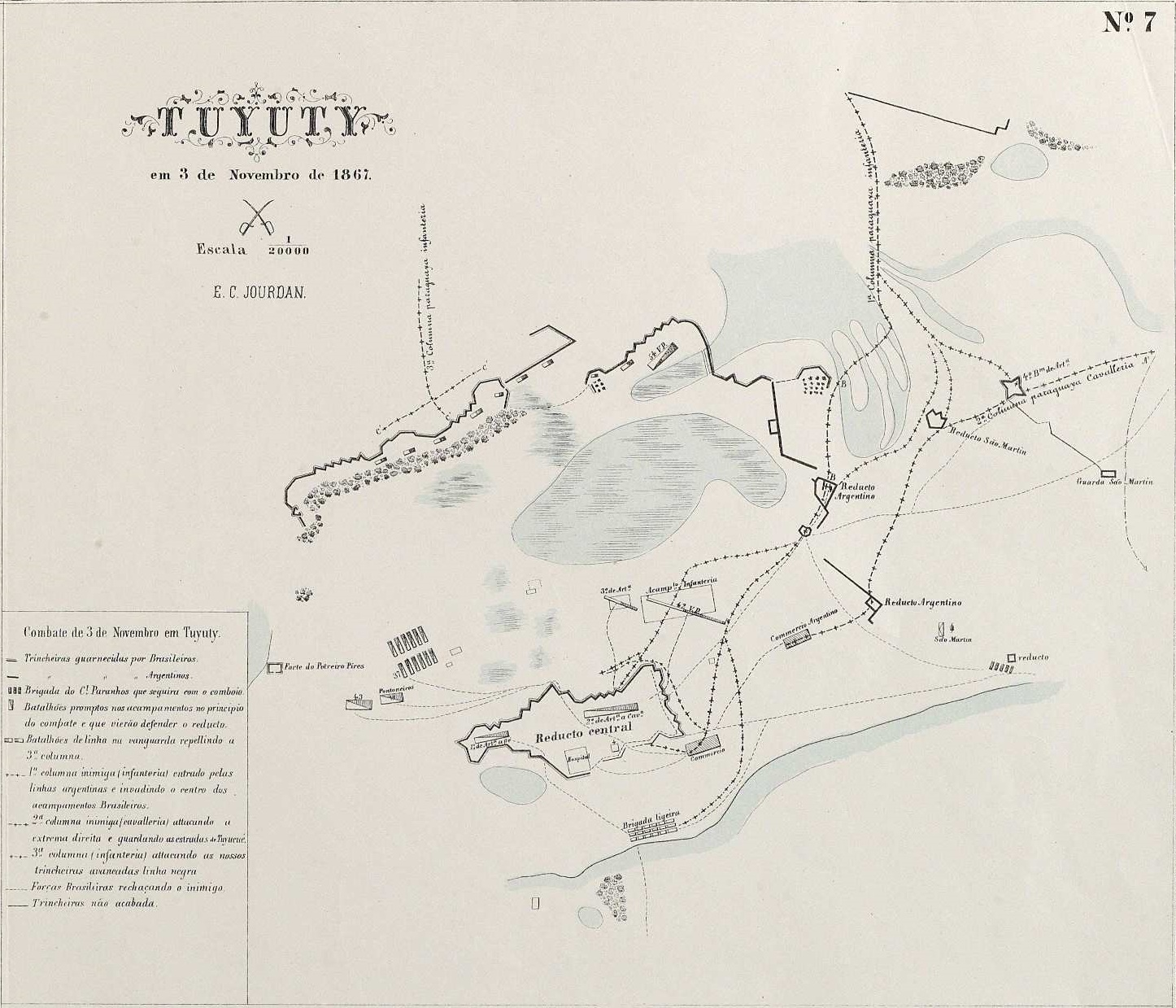
Date	3 November 1867
Location	Tuyutí, Paraguay
Result	Allied victory: Paraguayan attack repelled.

Belligerents
Paraguay	Empire of Brazil; Argentina

Commanders and leaders
Vicente Barrios	Marques de Sousa

Strength
8,000–9,000 men	~4,500 men: 3,000 Brazilians; 712 Argentines; 800 later reinforcements

Casualties and losses
2,889: 2,734 killed 155 captured	544: 294 killed ~250 captured

The Second Battle of Tuyutí was fought on 3 November 1867 between the Paraguayan Army and a smaller allied Brazilian-Argentine force. The Paraguayans lost twice as many soldiers as the allies and were defeated.

== Background ==
With the capture of Tayi on 2 November 1867 in the Paraguayan War, the Allied forces had the Paraguayan encampments of Humaitá and Curupayty along the Paraguay River encircled. General Mena Barreto had 5,000 men at Tayi, general Andrade Neves had a Brazilian division at Estancia San Solano, Marshal Caxias had 25,000 troops at Tuyucué and general Porto Alegre had 16,000 men at Tuyutí. Additionally, the Imperial Brazilian Navy had 18 steamers at Curuzú and 5 ironclads opposite to Humaitá. President Francisco Solano López decided to attack the Allied supply bases at Tuyutí and Itapirú on the Paraná River.

== Battle ==
The Paraguayan force of 9,000 men was under the command of brigadier general Vicente Barrios. They included two infantry divisions under colonels Giménez and González and a cavalry division under colonel Bernardino Caballero. The Paraguayan infantry were to attack from the east (from the area of Paso Yataytí Corá) in three columns at 04:30 on November 3. The cavalry was to make a wide sweep to the port of Itapirú and then charge the Allied rear.

The Paraguayan infantry quickly took the outer Allied entrenchments and pushed back the second line into the supply camp. The Paraguayans set about pillaging when they were attacked in the supply camp by an Allied artillery redoubt under the command of general Porto Alegre, which consisted of 1,800 men and 14 guns. By the time the Paraguayan cavalry reached Tuyutí, their infantry was in retreat, and an Argentine cavalry brigade of 800 men, under the command of general Manuel Hornos, had arrived from Tuyucué. The fighting was over by 21:00.

== Aftermath ==
Brigadier General Vicente Barrios was promoted to General of Division.

== Gallery ==
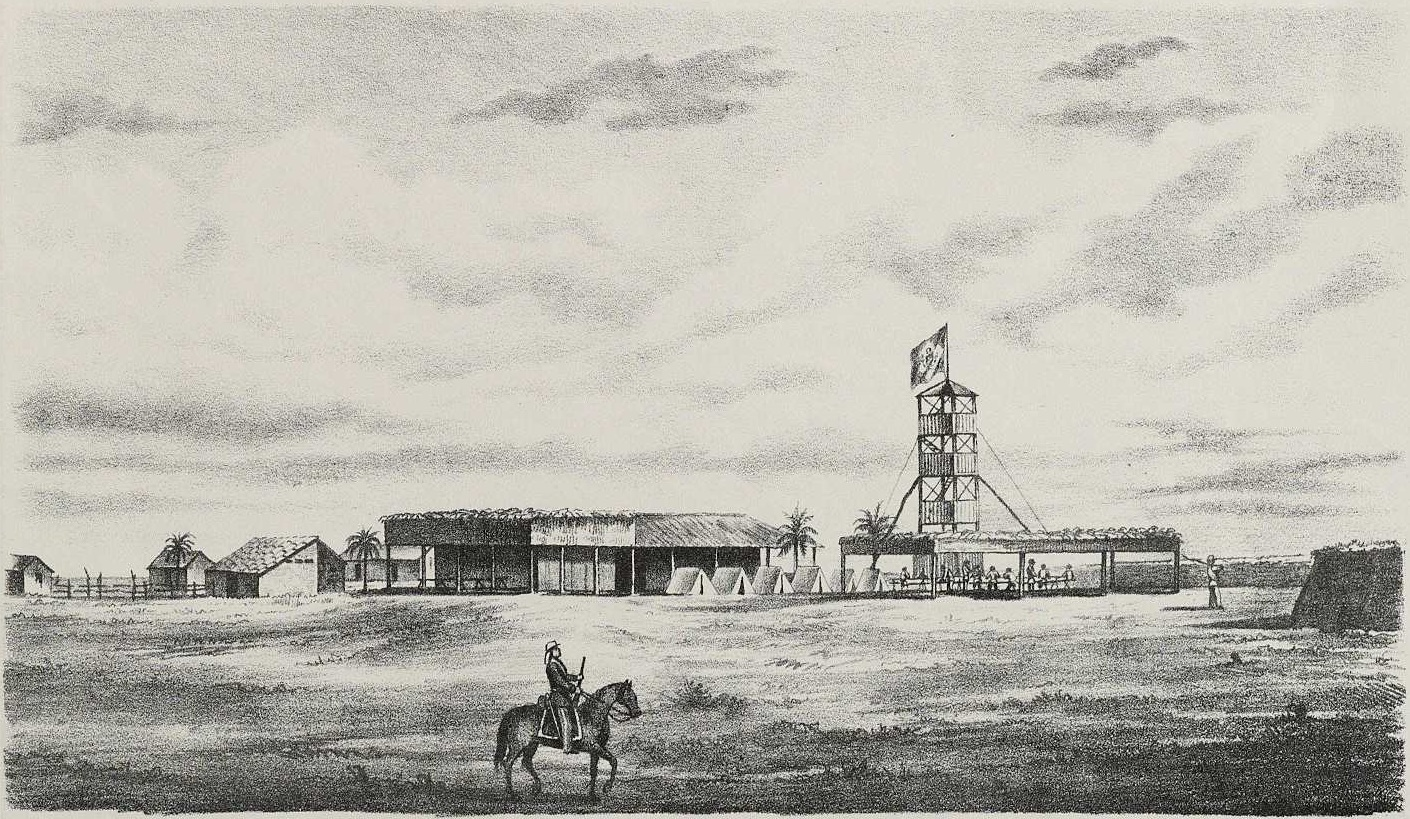
Brazilian headquarters at Tuyutí

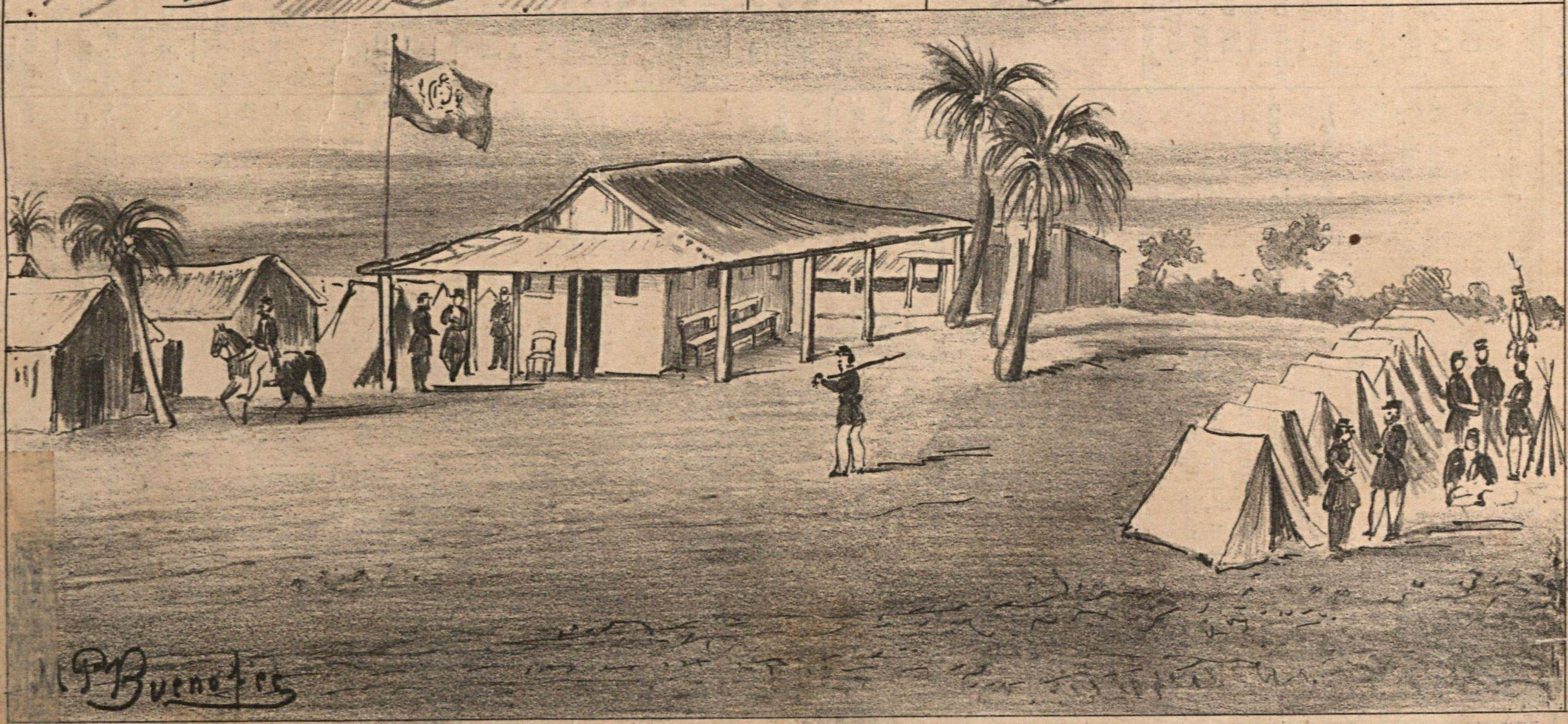
Residence of the Marquis de Caxias in Tuyuty, Republic of Paraguay.

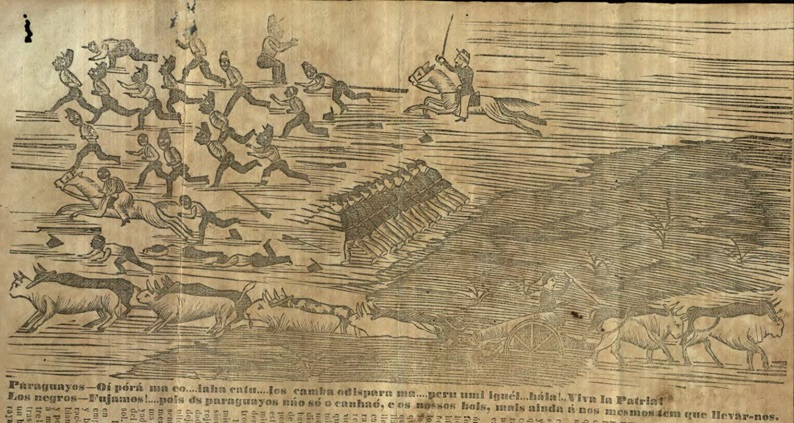

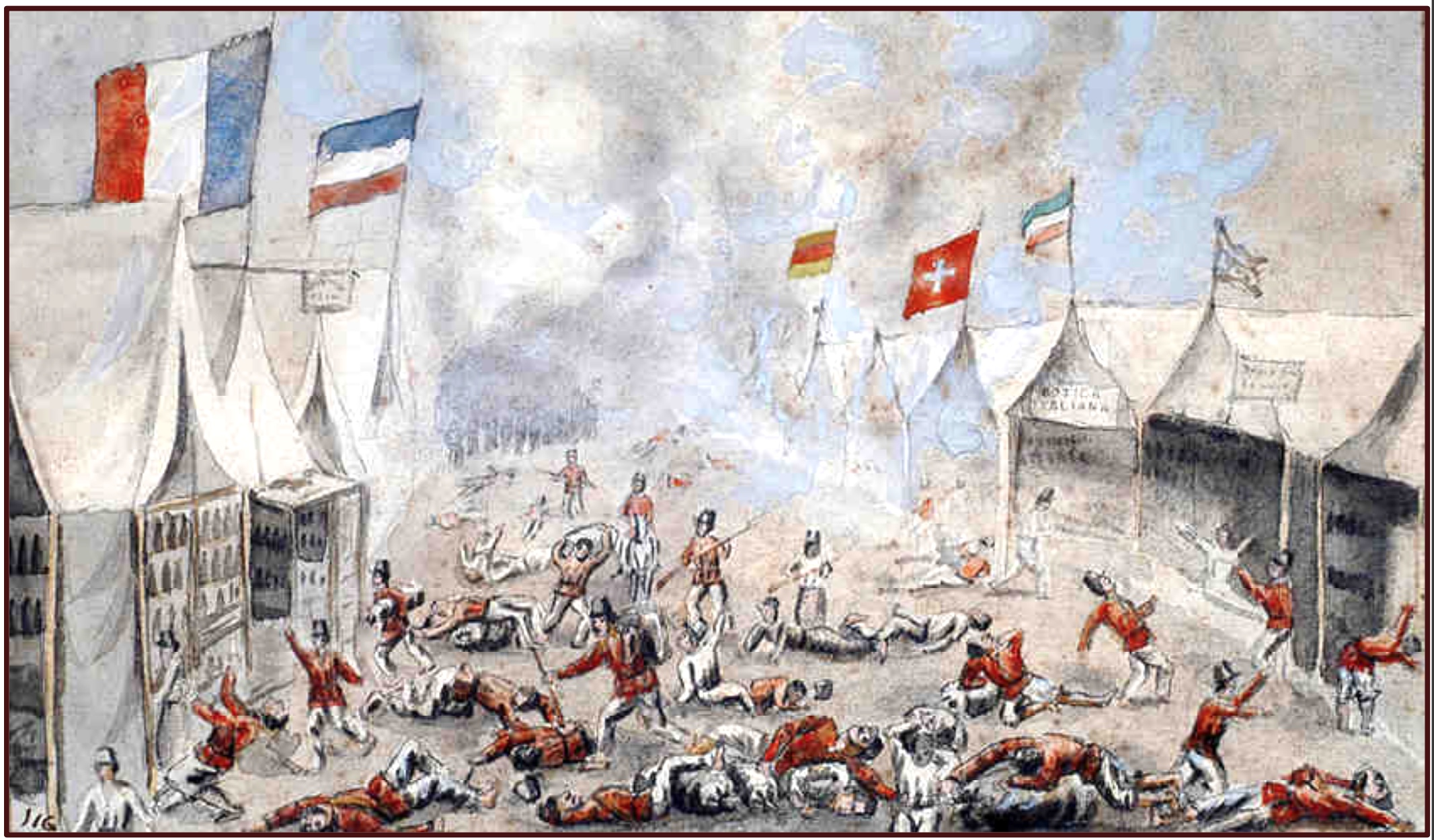
Paraguayan soldiers looting' allied base camp (here, sutlers' stores) at the Second Battle of Tuyutí, 3 November 1867. The flags denote the owners' nationalities e.g. Botica Italiana (José Ignacio Garmendia).

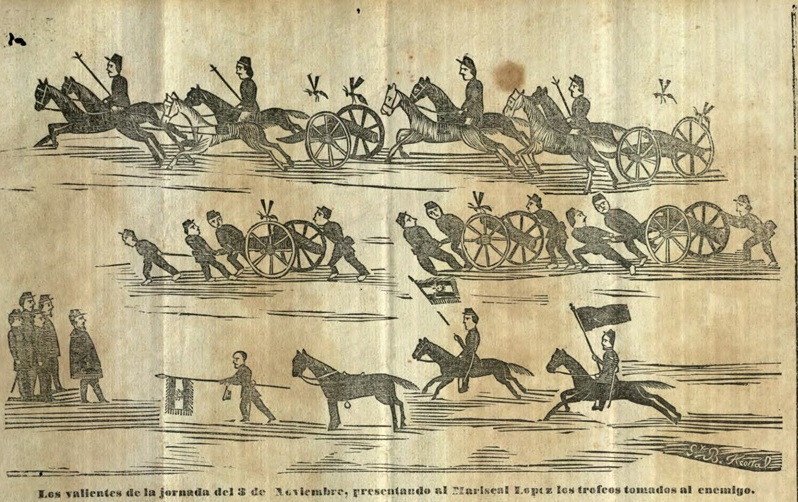

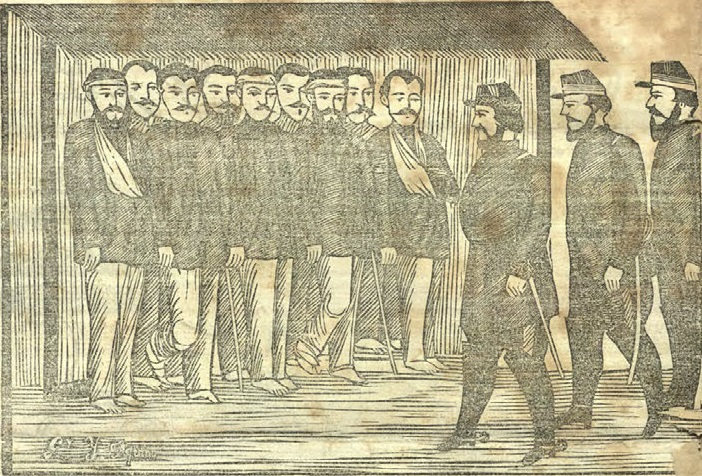
Solano López visiting the wounded in Tuyutí.

== Bibliography ==
- Doratioto, Francisco (2003). Maldita guerra: nova história da Guerra do Paraguai. Companhia das Letras. ISBN 978-85-359-0224-2.
