= Tuyutí =

Coordinates: 27°12′14.3″S 58°32′53.16″W

Tuyutí (Portuguese: Tuiuti), "white mud" in guaraní, is a marsh with a pond located in the southwest corner of Paraguay. It became famous during the Paraguayan War, while the allied army bivouacked on it for two years. The Battle of Tuyutí in 1866 was the biggest battle ever fought in South America and the deadliest day in the Americas history. The smaller Second Battle of Tuyutí was also fought there.

The ground is sandy, surrounded by flooded terrain, with rocks with more than 2 meters high. The land where the encampment stood was a small space of 4 by 2.4 km without maneuver space.

In the south is the marsh Bellaco and, to the west, the lake Piris. It is linked to the Paraguay river town of Curupayty, reached by a 1.5 km long track. To the north is the marsh Rojas and the Tuyutí lake, and to the east a large marshy region.

== Sources ==
- Doratioto, Francisco (2003). Maldita guerra: nova história da Guerra do Paraguai. Companhia das Letras. ISBN 978-85-359-0224-2.
