= Brazilian ship Pedro I =

Brazilian naval vessel (1763–1833)

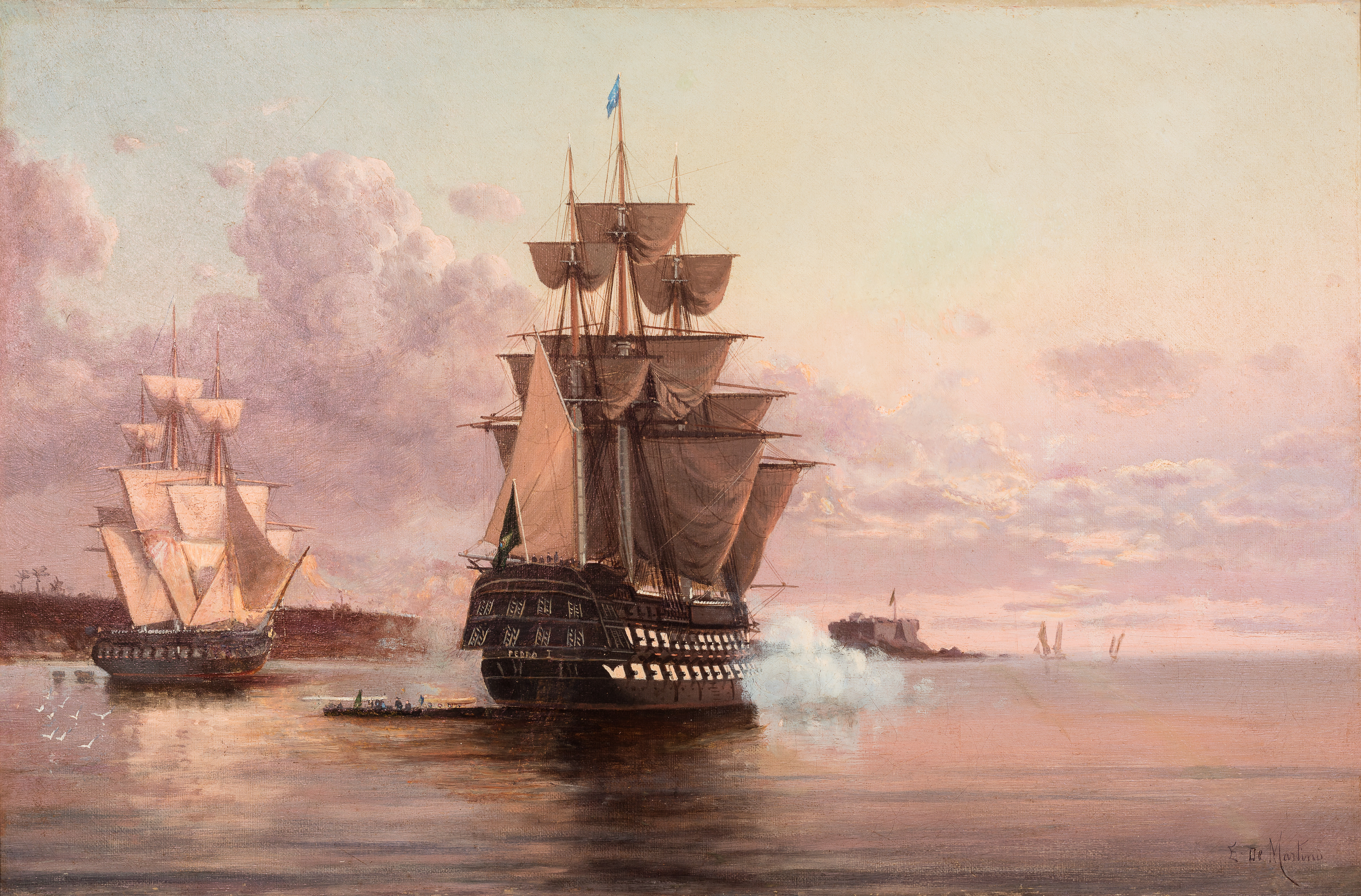
- Nau Pedro I, by Edoardo De Martino; Naval Museum collection

History

Kingdom of Portugal
- Name: Santo António e São José
- Namesake: Anthony of Padua and Saint Joseph
- Builder: Bahia Navy Arsenal
- Cost: 134,904,283 réis
- Laid down: 1 October 1760
- Launched: 29 January 1763
- Completed: 28 February 1763
- Renamed: Infante D. Pedro Carlos in 1794 and Martim de Freitas in 1808

U.K. of Portugal, Brazil and the Algarves
- Name: Martim de Freitas
- Namesake: Martim de Freitas (Alcaide of the Castle of Coimbra)

Empire of Brazil
- Name: Pedro I
- Namesake: Pedro I of Brazil
- Commissioned: 10 November 1822
- Decommissioned: 1833
- Fate: Scrapped
- Notes: First commander: Frigate captain João Batista Lourenço

General characteristics
- Type: Ship of the line
- Length: 60 metres (196 ft 10 in)
- Beam: 14 metres (45 ft 11 in)
- Draft: 6.37 metres (20 ft 11 in)
- Depth: 12 metres (39 ft 4 in)
- Sail plan: ship rig
- Complement: 600-900
- Armament: Santo António e São José: 70 guns; 26 × 24-pounder guns; 28 × 12-pounder guns; 8 × 9-pounder guns; 8 × 1-pounder guns; Pedro I: 74 guns; 24-pounder long guns; 32-pounder carronades

Pedro I was a 74-gun ship of the line of the Imperial Brazilian Navy. She was a third-rate, three-masted, two-decked ship. The ship was built by Antônio da Silva in the Bahia Navy Arsenal as a 70-gun ship of the line for the Portuguese Navy in 1763. First named Santo António e São José, she took part in several naval actions in the decades after its construction such as the bombardment of Algiers in 1784.

Renamed Martim de Freitas in 1806, she was part of the fleet involved in the transfer of the Portuguese court to Brazil during the Franco-Spanish invasion of Portugal. After the Brazilian War of Independence broke out, she was seized by the Brazilians and incorporated into the newly formed Brazilian navy to fight against the Portuguese as its first flagship. Under Thomas Cochrane, Brazil's first admiral, she took part in the battle of 4 May off Salvador.

During the Cisplatine War, she was tasked with transporting Pedro I of Brazil to southern Brazil; however, due to the death of Maria Leopoldina of Austria, the emperor's wife, the ship returned to Rio de Janeiro and did not take part in any further naval actions. Pedro I served her final years as a prison ship, being scrapped in 1833 after about 70 years of service.

== Design ==
The ship's keel measured 60m, 14m of beam, 12m of depth and 6.37m of draft. It was rigged as galera (ship-rigged), that is, it hoisted three robust masts. When first built, it had three spacious battery packs, with 70 hatches armed with carronades and culverins of heavy and medium caliber. (Note: According to Esparteiro 1976, p. 22, the ship was armed with 64 guns when first built.) Its first battery deck consisted of twenty six 24-pounder guns; the second battery deck consisted of twenty six 12-pounder guns; the aftercastle was armed with two 12-pounder, eight 9-pounder and four 1-pounder guns. It also had an additional four 1-pounder guns. Its crew, made up of sailors and troops, must have numbered between 600 and 700 men. (Note: According to Pereira 2012, p. 50, the ship's crew consisted of 552 men in 1781; in 1799 this number had risen to 634. By 1823, during the Brazilian War of Independence, the ship's crew was increased to 900 men, DPHDMa, p. 13.) As a symbol of fidelity, it had a dog as its figurehead, for which its sailors often referred to the ship as "Cão" (dog).

== Construction ==
The ship was built at the Bahia Navy Arsenal by shipbuilder Antônio da Silva. The keel was laid on 1 October 1760 and it was named, according to the tradition of the time, to the double blessing of Anthony of Padua and Saint Joseph. Construction work lasted for twenty-eight months; its launch took place on 29 January 1763, during the government of Marcos José de Noronha e Brito, the 6th Count of Arcos and 7th Viceroy of Brazil. The total construction cost was 134,904,283 réis.

== Service ==
=== In the Royal Portuguese navy ===
==== In Southern Brazil ====
Upon its completion, Santo António e São José departed for Santa Catarina in southern Brazil after completing a trip to Lisbon. The Portuguese expected Spanish attacks in the region and also planned to reconquer the part of the territory of present-day Brazilian state of Rio Grande do Sul that had been occupied by Spain as a result of the Fantastic War. This prompted the formation of a naval division to be stationed in Santa Catarina, with Santo António e São José as its flagship, in order to provide support for the troops on land and patrol the coast. The commander of such division was Irish officer Robert MacDouall. The commander of Santo António e São José was captain of sea and war José da Silva Pimentel.

The instructions sent on 9 August 1774 by the Marquis of Pombal to the Viceroy of Brazil, Luís de Almeida Portugal, the 2nd Marquis of Lavradio, read:

And ultimately considering that the defense of [Santa Catarina], as well as the actions of his royal troops on the southern continent [Rio Grande do Sul] could not be properly conducted without being assisted on the coast and the sea by a competent number of warships and frigates; using the above pretexts and similar ones, [the Marquis of Pombal] ordered to prepare and send to this port of Rio de Janeiro, at the orders of Your Excellency, the squadron of three ships of the line and four war frigates that are described in the fourth part of the aforementioned plan.

And he ordered, in order for the aforementioned squadron to be immediately deployed and ready there, the appointment of its commander and respective captains of sea and war, and their officers;

The aforementioned squadron seemed to be enough for the time being, given the advantages that it shall have in those seas over any other like it, even if they are superior in number; for our fleet and its ships can sustain themselves at sea at all times, having at their disposal the ports of this capital, those of Santa Catarina Island and Rio Grande of São Pedro (once it has been purged [from the Spaniards], as we hope) where they can find shelter and asylum in case of any incident; as to their [Spanish] fleets and ships, they will have as enemies all the coast of Brazil that runs from Rio de Janeiro to the stormy Río de la Plata, without finding outside this last one any place where they can avoid falling into our hands under a seizure, in cases where they are urgently constrained by storms and eventually shipwrecks that force them to take refuge in our ports in order to save their lives.

A table of MacDouall's squadron in 1777. Santo António e São José is the first ship on the left.

By 1 February 1775, the squadron had already reached Santa Catarina, with Santo António e São José serving as its flagship. The following year, on 6 February 1776, at 15:00, Santo António e São José sailed from Santa Catarina towards Rio Grande do Sul accompanied by nine vessels: two frigates, two corvettes, three smacks, a brig and a sloop. Part of the Santa Catarina Regiment embarked on these ships, this regiment was known as Barriga Verde, "Green Belly". The squadron reached its destination on 14 February, anchoring away from the coast. The next day, MacDouall went ashore in order to meet with the Army Commander in Operations.

Shortly after, heavy winds hit the squadron from the southeast, causing a lot of issues to it, as it was anchored outside the port, which was occupied by both naval and land Spanish forces. In the morning of 19 February, the squadron, headed by Santo António, entered the port and attacked the enemy naval forces stationed there the next day. In addition to some wounded, eight soldiers died in the combat. On 1 April of that same year, a new attack was carried out on the port's fortifications and naval forces. This attack ended in a Luso-Brazilian victory, as it gave them complete possession of Rio Grande do Sul.

===== Spanish attack on Santa Catarina island =====
By the end of 1776, a large Spanish fleet consisting of 20 warships and 97 transport ships carrying 12 thousand soldiers divided into four brigades, was sailing in the southern Brazilian coast. The fleet was commanded by admiral Antonio Barceló and the troops were commanded by Pedro de Cevallos, viceroy of the Río de la Plata. Their goal was to take control of Portuguese possessions in the region. The fleet was armed with a total of 674 guns, carrying 5,148 sailors and 1,308 marines on board.

On 6 February 1777, this fleet seized three Portuguese ships off the Brazilian coast. The Spaniards found official reports in the ships detailing the precarious state of Portuguese defenses in Santa Catarina Island and decided to attack and take control of it. Only on 17 February did the Portuguese notice the approach of the Spaniards. On 20 February, chief MacDuall gathered a council of commanders on board Santo António. One of them, a Portuguese admiral, was willing to fight the Spanish forces, but the instructions that had been sent to him by the 2nd Marquis of Lavradio ordered not to risk their fleet.

Out of the commanders, captain of sea and war José de Melo Brayner was the only one that voted to fight. The Portuguese then withdrew from the island, which was taken effortlessly by the Spaniards. Cevallos left a garrison on the island and sailed south, reaching Colonia del Sacramento on 22 May. The Portuguese fleet still patrolled the coast from time to time however. On 20 April 1778, Santo António, together with the ship of the line Prazeres, seized the Spanish ships San Agustín and Sant'Anna after a fierce combat off the coast of Santa Catarina, taking 750 prisoners.

==== In Europe ====
===== Bombardment of Algiers =====
In the 18th century, Barbary corsairs – especially Algerians – began raiding ships in the Mediterranean and on the western coast of the Iberian Peninsula. The peace treaty that Charles III of Spain celebrated with the Ottoman Empire did not stop corsair attacks on Spanish ships. As a result, a Spanish fleet, under the command of Antonio Barceló, carried out the bombardment of Algiers in 1783, which did little to stop the corsairs. It was then agreed that a new allied fleet, consisting of Spanish, Portuguese, Neapolitan and Maltese ships would attack Algiers.

On 23 May 1784, Bernardo Ramires Esquível was appointed commander of Santo António e São José; on 13 June, the ship carried out an armament display, having 421 men on board. The small Portuguese fleet that joined the allied naval forces consisted of the ships of the line Santo António e São José and Nossa Senhora do Bom Sucesso and the frigates Golfinho and Tritão. It departed from the port of Lisbon on 18 June and joined the rest of the allied fleet in Algiers on 12 July 1784, attacking it that same day.

==== Final years in the Portuguese navy ====
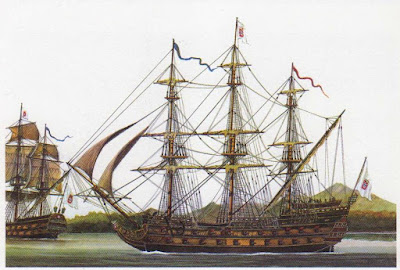
Martim de Freitas

On 1 April 1794, back in Lisbon, the ship underwent general repairs and modernization; the works were completed on 14 June and the ship was renamed Infante D. Pedro Carlos in honor of the Spanish prince Pedro Carlos of Spain and Portugal, nephew of Portuguese prince John, future consort of Maria Teresa of Braganza, the Princess of Beira, and General Admiral of the Royal Portuguese Navy.

After a series of trips from Europe to Brazil in the following years, D. Pedro Carlos once again underwent repairs in 1806, being renamed Martim de Freitas. With the Napoleonic Wars raging in Europe and the subsequent French invasion of Portugal, the Portuguese royal family decided to flee to Brazil bringing with it its court. D. Pedro Carlos was part of the fleet that brought the royal family to Brazil, departing from Lisbon on 29 November 1807 and reaching Rio de Janeiro in March 1808. Upon their arrival, the Portuguese ships, including D. Pedro Carlos, fell into disrepair and were left anchored in Rio de Janeiro.

=== In the Imperial Brazilian navy ===
==== Brazilian War of Independence ====
After the return of king John VI to Portugal as a result of the Revolution of Porto, a letter of 26 October 1821 ordered Prince Regent Pedro, his son, to make all the ships stationed in Brazil ready to return to Lisbon. These included the ships of the line Martim de Freitas, Vasco da Gama and Afonso de Albuquerque. Perhaps the Portuguese cortes, already fearing independence movements in Brazil, wanted to secure control of the ships.

Martim de Freitas was undergoing repairs in Rio de Janeiro. On 7 September 1822, prince Pedro proclaimed Brazil's independence from Portugal in what became known as the Cry of Ipiranga. Hostilities between Brazilians and the Portuguese were already happening all over Brazil. Pedro quickly set out to create a naval force capable of facing off the Portuguese forces in Brazil and the ones that could eventually be sent from Europe in order to keep the territorial integrity of the empire. Brazil's finance minister, Martim Francisco Ribeiro de Andrada, created a national subscription campaign to fund the acquisition of a war fleet and repair the existing ships. Martim de Freitas, whose repairs were almost finished, was rearmed and incorporated into the newly formed Imperial Brazilian Navy, being renamed Pedro I in honor of Brazil's first emperor. On 10 November 1822 it hoisted the flag of the Empire of Brazil for the first time, which was accompanied by a cannon salvo.

The most serious problem faced by Brazilian authorities during the formation of the Brazilian Navy was the severe shortage of officers. The government decided to hire foreign officers, especially British and French ones. The most prominent among them was Thomas Cochrane, who had recently arrived in Brazil after fighting the Spaniards in the Chilean War of Independence. By decree of 21 March 1823 Cochrane was given command of the Brazilian Navy in the war against Portugal, becoming Brazil's first admiral. Cochrane chose Pedro I to be the navy's flagship. The admiral hoisted his flag on the ship that same day, having remarked:

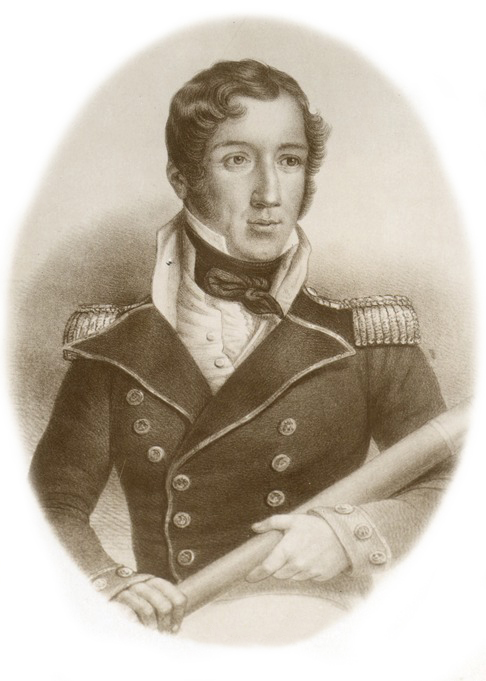
Lord Thomas Cochrane

The next day – 15 March – His Imperial Majesty invited me to come to the Palace, in an early hour, in order to accompany him on a visit to the warships, some of which greatly pleased me, as a demonstrative proof of the efforts that in a short time must have been done to bring the ships to such a commendable condition. Great care was seen to have been done on Pedro I, a 74-gun ship of the line, although in the English service it was said to be a 64. It was evidently a sailing ship and was ready for the sea, with four months of supplies on board, which only filled half of the bulge, as it had so much storage capacity. So I found a reason to be satisfied with my flagship.

On the 21st, at 16:00, I went aboard Pedro I and hoisted my flag, which was accompanied by a 21 shot salvo from each warship, the salvo was answered by the flagship in equal amount. The lack of sailors was felt and little more had been done than put on board a number of Portuguese sailors, whose allegiance to the imperial cause was doubtful.

In the hope of finding a class of people for the flagship in which one could have more confidence, I authorized commander Crosbie to offer eight bucks per man from my expenses in addition to the prize given by the Government, and by this means I sought out some English and American sailors who, along with those who came with me from Chile, were enough for the nucleus of the future crew. As for the rest, although it is still much lower than the complement of the ship, I had never commanded such insufficient crew.

On 3 April we set sail. There were only 160 British and American sailors on board the flagship, the rest was made up of the capital's vagrancy, with 130 black sailors who had just been freed from slavery".

On 3 April 1823, Pedro I departed from Guanabara Bay for Bahia in order to blockade the Portuguese forces stationed there and support general Pierre Labatut's forces on land. Its commander was frigate captain Thomaz Sackville Crosbie. Crosbie's staff included admiral Cochrane, secretary and first lieutenant Victor Santiago Subrá, captain lieutenant John Pascoe Grenfell, first lieutenant William Eyre, second lieutenant William Parker, midshipman Pedro Paulo Boutrolle, commissar José Cristóvão Salgado, chaplain Marista Augusto de Santa Rita and scrivener Manoel Fernandes Pinto. Apart from Pedro I, Cochrane's fleet also consisted of the frigates Piranga and Niterói, the brigs Real Pedro and Guarani, and the corvettes Maria da Glória and Liberal.

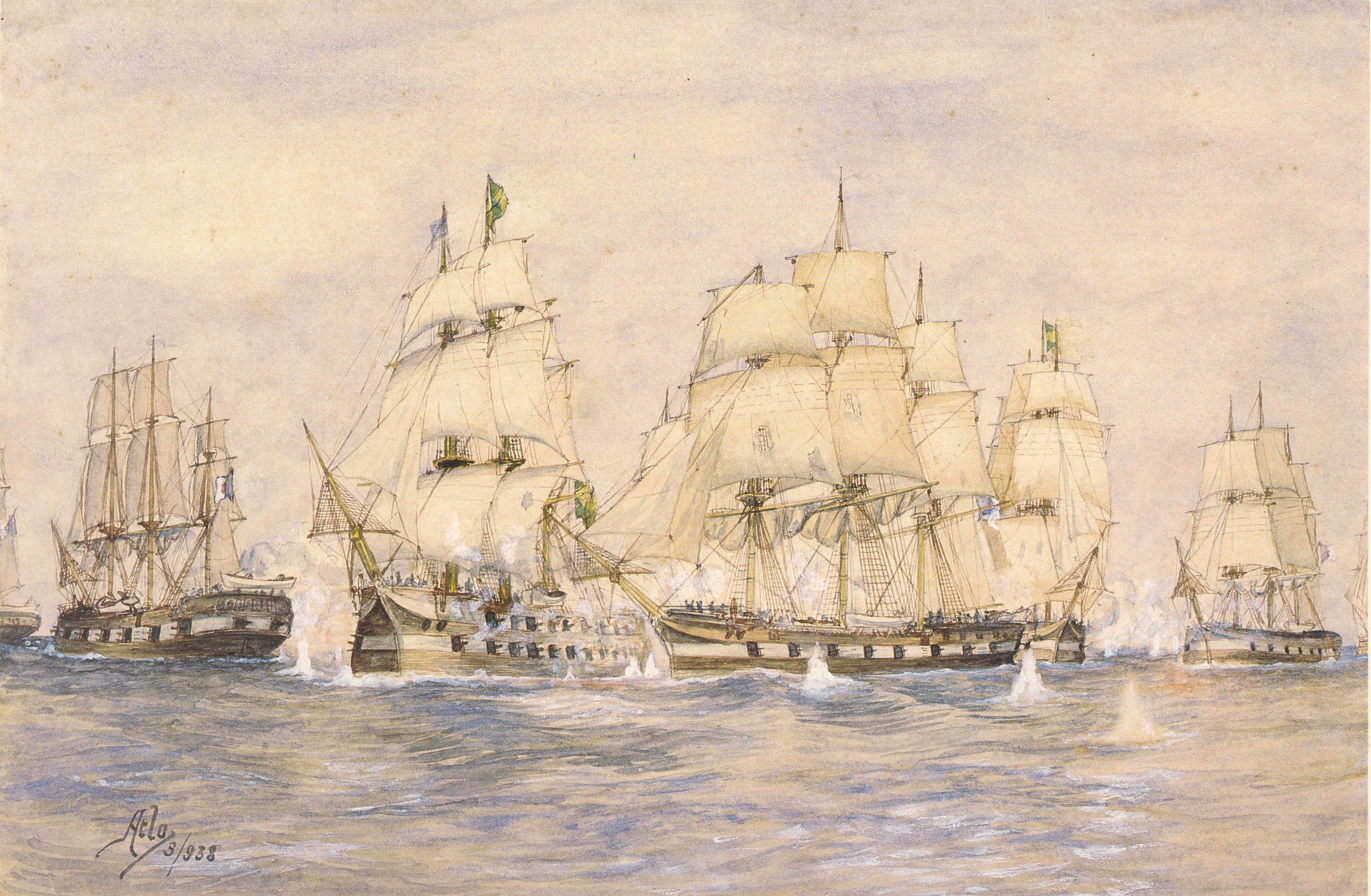
Battle of 4 May

On 4 May 1823 it fought against a larger Portuguese fleet, damaging it, but with no victory for either side, as its Portuguese powder monkeys refused to provide ammunition for the guns at the height of the battle. On that battle Pedro I suffered 17 casualties between killed and wounded. Dissatisfied, Cochrane wrote to José Bonifácio detailing the unreliability of the ships' crews, remarking that Pedro I was the only ship that could attack an enemy warship or operate against superior enemy forces despite also having an unreliable crew. On 5 May the ship entered Morro de São Paulo. There the 18-pounder guns on the deck were replaced by the 24-pounder guns of the frigate Ipiranga, which were lighter. The 32-pounder carronades of Ipiranga were also mounted on Pedro I's orlop, increasing its total guns. The ship's crew was complemented to a total of 900 men, gathered from the rest of the squadron. After the changes, Pedro I had one 32-pounder battery and two 24-pounder batteries.

On 12 June, accompanied by two more ships, Pedro I entered the port of Bahia and attempted to attack the Portuguese fleet that was anchored there. The lack of wind and the low tide frustrated Cochrane's attack. The Portuguese fleet decided to leave Salvador on 1 July. On 2 July, Pedro I left with the other ships of the fleet in pursuit of the Portuguese way up the Equator line, managing to capture many enemy ships, however, admiral Cochrane decided to return on July 17 to subdue the northern parts of Brazil that were still under Portuguese control. Out of the 70-ship Portuguese convoy that left Bahia, only 13 ships managed to reach Lisbon.

On 26 July, Pedro I arrived in São Luís, capital of Maranhão, which was still occupied by the Portuguese. After entering the port, a feat never hitherto carried out by a ship of that type, and making an elevation shot over the city in such a way that terrified the Portuguese occupiers, Cochrane told the Portuguese his ship was the spearhead of a large Brazilian fleet, the strategy worked and the Portuguese surrendered the town on 31 July. It was immediately incorporated into the Brazilian Empire. For his service, Cochrane was awarded the Order of the Southern Cross and the nobility title of Marquess of Maranhão on 23 November 1823.

==== Confederation of the Equator ====
On 2 August 1824, Pedro I left for Pernambuco, where the Confederation of the Equator had been proclaimed, flying lord Cochrane's pavilion and carrying troops from the army that landed in the port of Jaraguá in Maceió. At the beginning of October it sailed north until it reached Ceará, from where it returned to Recife. From there the ship sailed to Salvador on October 10, docking at the Bay of All Saints on October 24. It then returned to the north, docking for a while in Maranhão. There, after requesting his payment, paying a portion that was his debt and satisfying the officers and crew, admiral Cochrane transferred his pavilion to the frigate Piranga, and sailed back to England. There, he asked to be dismissed from service in the Brazilian navy.

==== Cisplatine War ====
On 24 November 1826 emperor Pedro I embarked on Pedro I and sailed south in order to deal with the ongoing Cisplatine War between the Empire of Brazil and the United Provinces of the Río de la Plata over control of the Brazilian Cisplatina province. On that occasion Pedro I was commanded by chief of division Diogo Jorge de Brito and the squadron was commanded by admiral Manuel Antônio Farinha, the Count of Sousel. During the trip south, the Argentine corsair frigate Chacabuco appeared in its course, but was pursued and some shots were fired at it. Pedro I was heavier and the Argentine frigate managed to escape. Pedro I reached Santa Catarina, from where the emperor went by land to Rio Grande do Sul. However, he didn't reach his destination, having soon changed his course back to Rio de Janeiro, due to the death of his wife, empress Maria Leopoldina of Austria, on 11 December 1826. On 4 January 1827 the ship sailed back to Rio de Janeiro carrying the emperor on board, reaching its destination on January 15.

As if it were immediately a matter of properly equipping it for war, deputy Bernardo Pereira de Vasconcelos, in August 1827, expressed his thoughts regarding Pedro I in the tribune of the General Assembly:

"I believe that this ship should not be armed because Mr. Cunha Mattos, in another session, said that it is very rotten and that it was not in a state of navigation, pointing to the year it sailed, which I believe was 1793, at which point it was already old. Furthermore, there is another reason, and is that it is [Pedro I] not needed to beat the insignificant Argentine privateers".

==== Final years ====
By 1832 Pedro I was serving only as a prison ship as it was already too rotten and incapable of navigating. By that time its crew numbered only 186 men. Some of its parts were removed to be sold. By the second half of 1833 it was still serving as a prison ship, being scrapped in Rio de Janeiro.

== See also ==
- List of historical ships of the Brazilian Navy
