= Portuguese civil war =

There have been several Portuguese civil wars.

- Portuguese Civil War of 1245–1247
- 1383–85 Portuguese crisis
- Battle of Alfarrobeira (1449)
- War of the Portuguese Succession (1580–1583)
- Portuguese Civil War (1828–1834), also known as the Liberal Wars
- Patuleia (1846–1847)
- Monarchy of the North (1919)
