= Portuguese Civil War of 1245–1247 =

Portuguese Civil War (1245–1247)
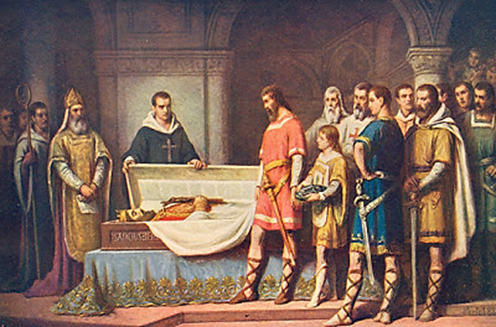
- "Martim de Freitas checking in the cathedral of Toledo the death of King D. Sancho II" by Caetano Costa Lima, c. 19th century
Date	July 24, 1245 – Late 1247
Location	Kingdom of Portugal
Result	Victory for Afonso, Count of Boulogne

Belligerents
Pro-Sancho Portugal; Supported by: Crown of Castile	Pro-Afonso Portugal; Supported by: Papal States

Commanders and leaders
Sancho II # Queen Mécia (POW); Prince Alfonso …and others	Afonso III of Portugal; Innocent IV …and others

The Portuguese Civil War (1245–1247), also known as 1245 Revolution or the Crisis of 1245, was a conflict between King Sancho II and his brother Afonso, Count of Boulogne, over the Portuguese throne. Sancho II faced opposition from the nobility and clergy due to his governance, leading Pope Innocent IV to declare him unfit to rule and appoint Afonso as regent. Afonso won the war, and Sancho was forced into exile in Castile.

== Background ==
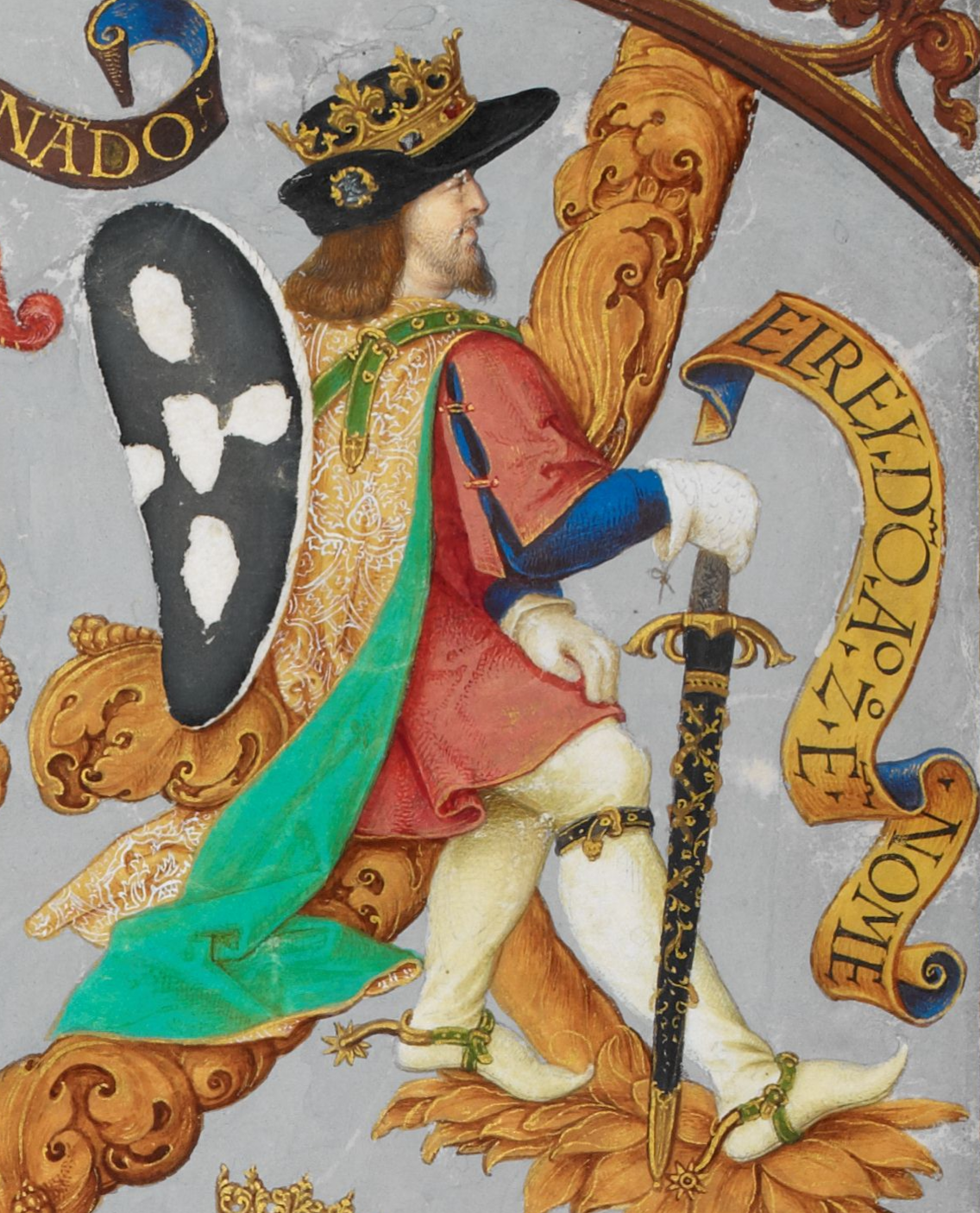
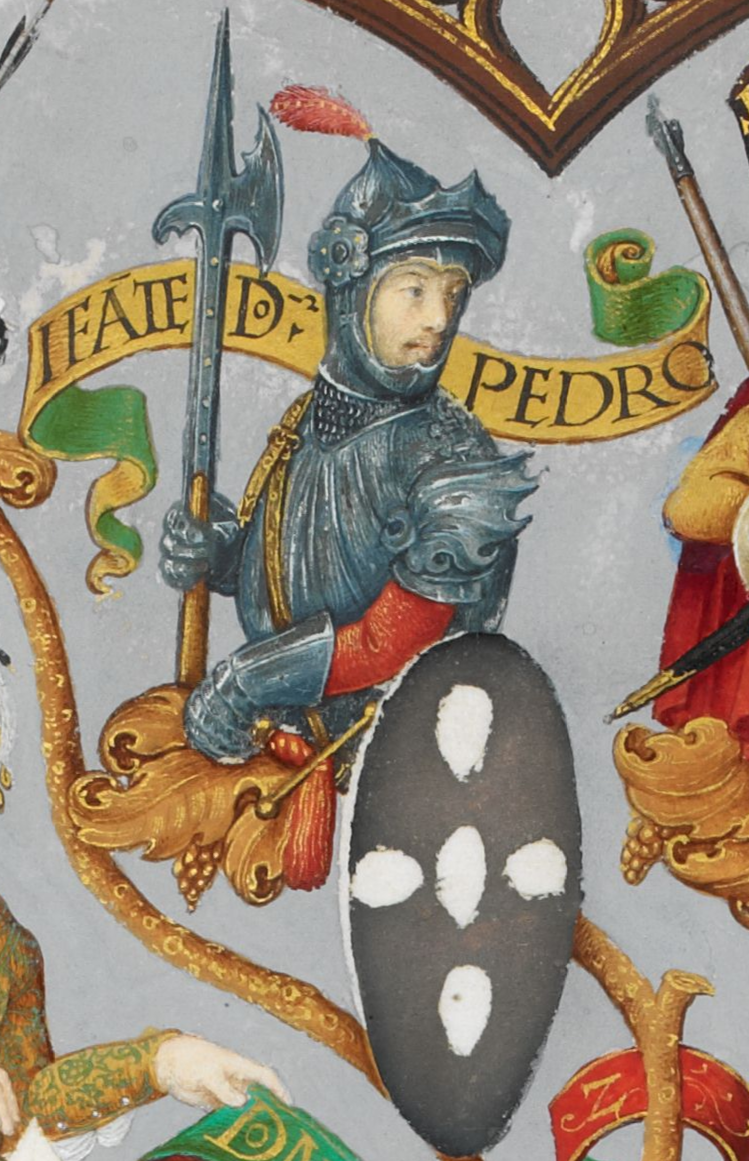
Afonso II of Portugal (left) and Pedro Sanches (right)

The roots of the crisis can be traced back to the reign of Afonso II, beginning in March 27, 1211. At that time, conflicts emerged over the succession, with some factions favoring the infante Pedro Sanches, possibly due to claims that Afonso II suffered from leprosy. Although Afonso II secured the throne, tensions remained, with some nobles joining Alfonso IX of León in border conflicts and others supporting the king's sisters in disputes over their father's will.

Afonso II made efforts to centralize power, particularly through inquirições (royal inquiries), confirmations, and legal reforms influenced by Roman law, which weakened the privileges of the nobility and the clergy, but created opposition.

When Afonso II died in March 25, 1223, the faction that opposed his centralization gained influence. The new king, Sancho II, was only 13 years old and was initially guided by the Archbishop of Braga.

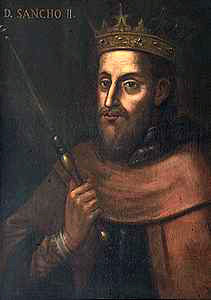
Sancho II of Portugal

Despite the efforts of papal legate John of Abbeville to mediate the tensions between the nobility and the church, they remained, and Sancho II continued focusing on his military campaigns rather than the growing internal conflicts.

Instability only worsened. From 1226, noble factions fought each other and there were more reports of violence and banditry. By 1237, Sancho II was in conflict with the bishops of Lisbon, Guarda, and Braga. (Note: The bishops of Porto and Braga informed the Papacy, reporting the monarch's inability to control the situation and maintain justice in the kingdom.)

== Crisis and Civil War ==
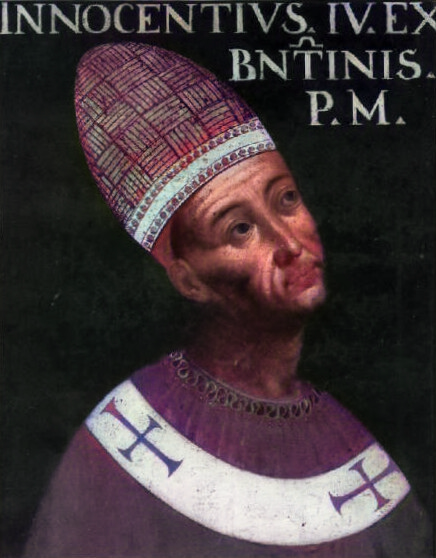
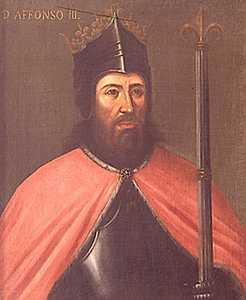
Pope Innocent IV (left) and Afonso, Count of Boulogne (right)

In February 1245, Pope Innocent IV, encouraged by Afonso, Count of Boulogne, declared Sancho's marriage with Mécia Lopes de Haro null and, one month later, issued the Inter alia desiderabilia bull. In July 24 of the same year, the Grandi non immerito bull declared Sancho a "rex inutilis" (useless king) and transferred the administration of Portugal to the Count of Boulogne, Afonso III, which led to the civil war.

=== Battle of Gaia, 1245 ===
In August 1245, rival noble factions fought in Gaia, resulting in the death Rodrigo Sanches and Abril Peres de Lumiares, both supporters of the Count, by an army led by Martim Gil de Soverosa. Meanwhile, Afonso, alongside exiled bishops and nobles, prepared to take control.

=== Siege of Coimbra, 1246 ===
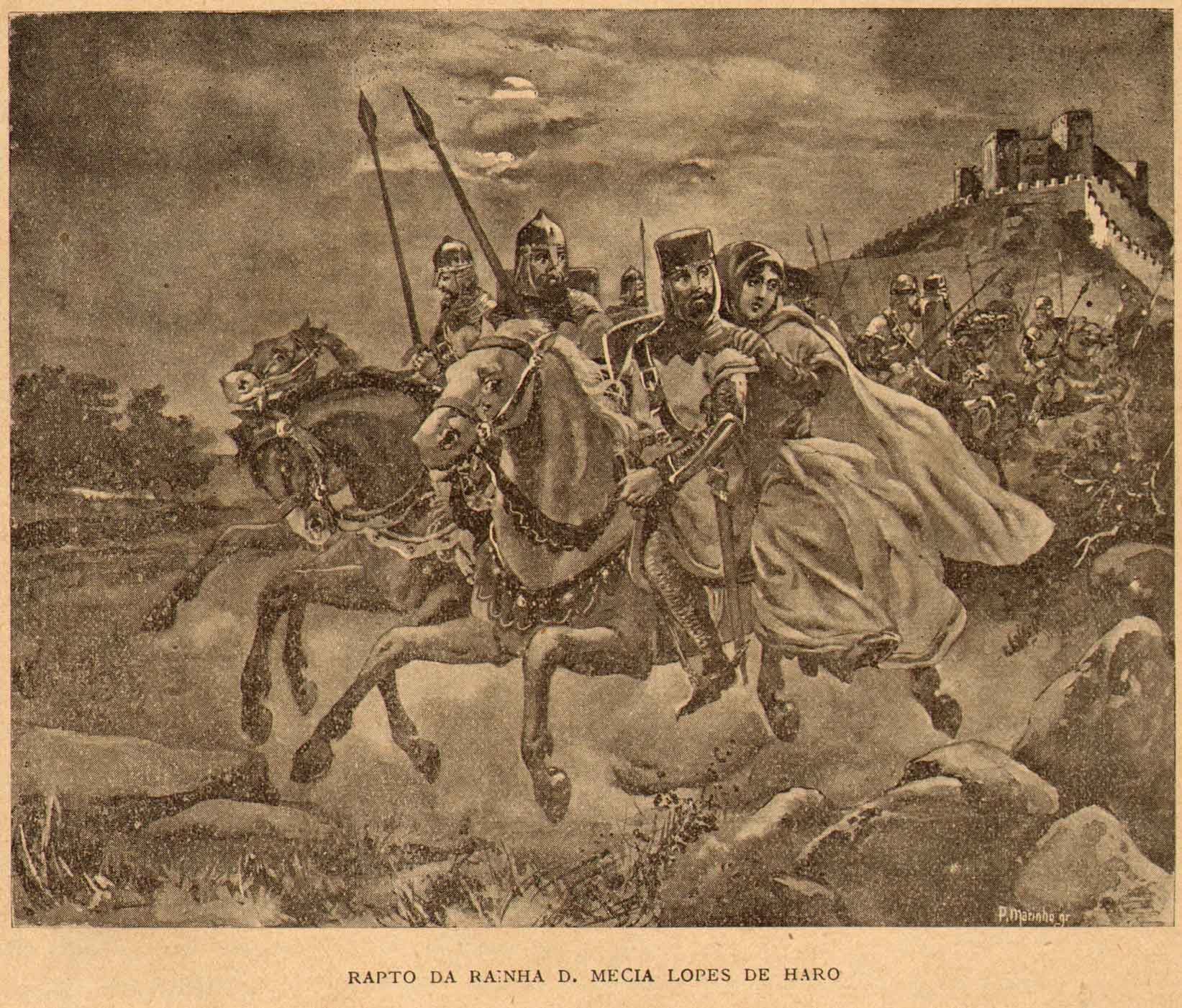
Kidnapping of Queen D. Mécia Lopes de Haro, Illustration by Alfredo Roque Gameiro

He landed in Lisbon between the final days of December 1245 and the beginning of January 1246. Upon his arrival, the Count of Boulogne turned his attention to Coimbra, Sancho II's primary stronghold. During the siege of the city, Queen Mécia was captured in the summer of 1246 and imprisoned in the fortress of Ourém.

=== Battle of Leiria, 1246 ===
The Count was however unable to conquer Coimbra, so he shifted his focus to Óbidos and Leiria. He entered Leiria on April 2, 1246, after facing some resistance from the castle's defenders, led by Martim Fernandes de Urgezes, who surrender after a month. Several of Sancho II's supporters were killed, including Suero Gomes de Tougues and Lourenço Fernandes de Gundar, while others, such as Vasco Gil de Soverosa, were captured.

The conflict reached a stalemate, as Sancho II disrupted the Count's supply lines in Leiria.

=== Battle of Leiria, 1247 ===
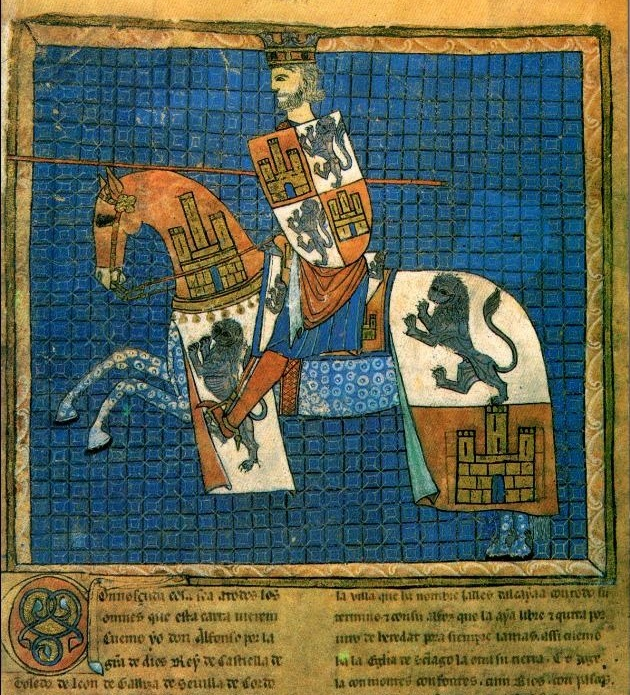
Prince Alfonso of Castile, future King Alfonso X, c. 13th century

In January 13, 1247, Sancho II, along with Martim Gil de Soverosa and Castilian forces under Infante Alfonso of Castile and Diego López de Haro, made one last attempt to take over Leiria. In the attack, the troops of Sancho II and Alfonso of Castile caused more than two hundred deaths among the forces of the Count of Boulogne, but they were unable to regain the city, and it remained under the Count's domain.

=== Incident at Trancoso, 1247 ===
After their defeat in Leiria, the forces of Sancho II and Infante Alfonso of Castile began their retreat towards the Kingdom of León. On their way back they approached the Castle of Trancoso, where many of their adversaries were imprisoned. A certain Fernão Garcia de Sousa, accompanied only by his squire, came forth and challenged Martim Gil de Soverosa. He offered to renew allegiance to the King if Martim Gil, whom he called a public enemy, were dismissed.

However, Sancho II refused to allow the combat. According to Rui de Pina, Martim Gil then attempted to kill Fernão Garcia de Sousa by treachery.

=== End of the war ===
Finding resistance impossible, Infante Alfonso of Castile left Portugal, and Sancho II was eventually forced into exile by late 1247 and died in Toledo in January 1248.

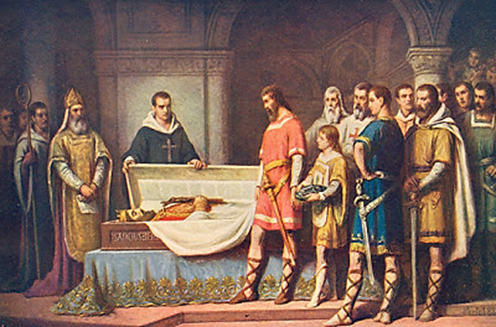
Martim de Freitas verifying the death of King D. Sancho II, c. 19th century

Martim de Freitas, the governor of Coimbra, became a legend for holding the capital for King Sancho II until his master's death in Toledo. Freitas only agreed to surrender after traveling to Toledo to view his master's body in a casket.

== Aftermath ==
Now king, Afonso III began a process of pacification and centralization. His first acts included completing the conquest of the Algarve in 1249 and the Cortes of Guimarães in 1250.

== List of supporters ==
=== Supporters of Sancho II of Portugal ===
- Sancho II of Portugal #
- Queen Mécia (POW)
- Prince Alfonso and his vassals: (Note: …Sancho II with his valid, with the help of Infante Afonso de Castela, future Afonso X, and his vassals including D. Nuno Gonçalves de Lara, D. Diogo Lopes de Biscaia, brother-in-law of King D. Sancho II, D. Rui Gomes da Galiza, D. Fernando Anes de Lima, D. Rodrigo Forjaz de Leão…)
  - Nuno Gonçalves de Lara
  - Diego López de Haro
  - Rui Gomes of Galiza
  - Fernando Anes de Lima
  - Rodrigo Forjaz of León
- Martim Gil de Soverosa
- Martim Fernandes de Urgezes (surrendered)
- Suero Gomes de Tougues †
- Lourenço Fernandes de Gundar †
- Vasco Gil de Soverosa (POW)
- Manrique Gil de Soverosa
- João Gil de Soverosa
- Martim de Freitas (surrendered)

=== Supporters of Afonso, Count of Boulogne ===
- Afonso, Count of Boulogne
- Innocent IV
- Tibúrcio of Coimbra #
- Rodrigo Sanches †
- Abril Peres de Lumiares †
- Fernão Garcia de Sousa

== Bibliography ==
- Mattoso, José (1984). "Revoltas e Revoluções" (PDF) (in Portuguese).
- Medina, Inés Calderón (2013). "La solidaridad familiar. La participación de la nobleza leonesa en la guerra civil de Portugal (1245-1247)" (in Spanish).
- Ventura, Leontina (1993). "Leiria na crise de 1245-1248" (PDF) (in Portuguese).
- Martins, Miguel Gomes (2014). A arte da guerra em Portugal (in Portuguese). Imprensa da Universidade de Coimbra / Coimbra University Press. ISBN 9789892606958.
- Pizarro, José Augusto (1997). Linhagens Medievais Portuguesas: Genealogias e Estratégias (1279-1325) (in Portuguese). Tese de Doutoramento, Edicão do Autor. hdl:10216/18023.
- Livermore, H. V. (January 19, 1947). A History of Portugal. Cambridge University Press.
