= Estabelecimento de Fundição e Estaleiros Ponta da Areia =

Coordinates: 22.8772°S 43.1283°W

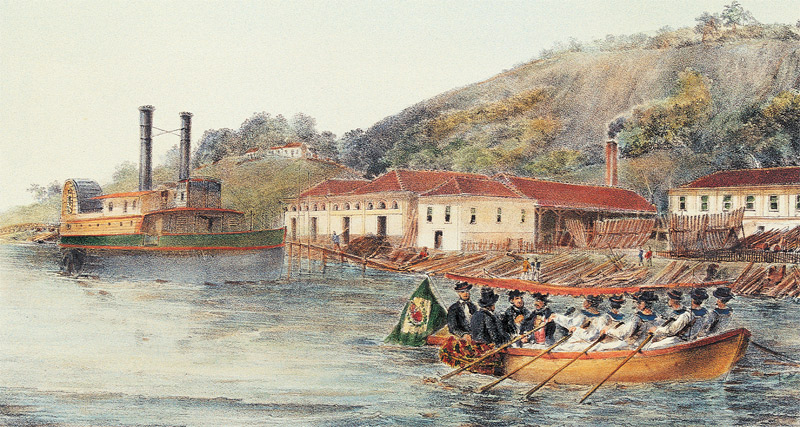
- The Baron of Mauá inspecting the Ponta da Areia Shipyard in Niterói, 1857 lithography by Pieter Godfred Bertichen, National Library of Brazil
- Native name: Estabelecimento de Fundição e Estaleiros Ponta d'Areia
- Industry: Shipbuilding, Defence,
- Founded: 1844; 182 years ago
- Founder: Charles Collmann
- Defunct: 1905; 121 years ago
- Fate: Merged
- Successor: Estaleiro Mauá
- Headquarters: Niterói, Brazil
- Products: Warships, workboats, pipes, cannons, cranes
- Services: Shipbuilding and services
- Number of employees: ~1,000

Estabelecimento de Fundição e Estaleiros Ponta da Areia (English: Foundry Establishment and Shipyards Ponta da Areia) was one of the first shipbuilding industries in Brazil, having been founded by Charles Colman in 1844 and acquired in 1846 by Irineu Evangelista de Sousa, future Baron and Viscount of Mauá.

== History ==
After the opening of the ports in 1808, small private shipyards appeared in Brazil. With the independence of Brazil, the naval sector gradually restructured itself to cope with the growing demand for means of locomotion of cargo and passengers by river and/or sea.

Until the mid-1840s, shipyards and small foundries dedicated to shipbuilding were concentrated around the Brazilian Navy arsenal and the Ponta da Areia, in Niterói. In mid 1844, the British Charles Colmann opens a small foundry on the Ponta da Areia in Niterói. The foundry goes from bad to worse, and on August 11, 1846, Colmann sells this small business to Irineu Evangelista de Sousa, who renames it Estabelecimento de Fundição e Estaleiros da Ponta d'Areia.

For the next 30 years the Ponta da Areia Shipyard produced 72 vessels for the most varied purposes such as cabotage, cargo transport, passengers, warships, and small vessels, with emphasis on the twelve vessels ordered by the Imperial Navy of Brazil between 1849 and 1869.

Its facilities were integrated to Companhia Comércio e Navegação (CCN) in 1905, the year this company was founded, specializing in ship construction and repair. At the time, CCN was also one of the largest construction and repair companies in Latin America.

== See also ==
- List of ships of the Brazilian Navy
- Brazilian Marine Corps
- Arsenal de Marinha do Rio de Janeiro
