= Brazilian corvette Liberal =

19th century Brazilian warship

History

Kingdom of Portugal
- Name: Gaivota do Mar
- Namesake: Gull
- Acquired: 30 September 1791
- Fate: Joined Brazil, 1822

Empire of Brazil
- Name: Liberal
- Namesake: Liberal
- Commissioned: 1822
- Decommissioned: 1840s
- Fate: Scrapped

General characteristics
- Type: Brig, later converted to corvette
- Length: 100 ft (30 m)
- Beam: 30 ft (9.1 m)
- Depth: 17 ft (5.2 m)
- Complement: Brig: 130 – 155
- Armament: Brig: 22 cannons, including 2 × 18-pounder and 20 × 24-pounder long guns; Corvette: 24 cannons

Liberal was a corvette of the Imperial Brazilian Navy. She was originally built as a brig named Gaivota do Mar before joining the Brazilian cause during the war of independence, being renamed and converted to a corvette.

== History ==
Liberal, originally Gaivota do Mar, was built at the Lisbon Navy Arsenal and launched in the river Tagus on 30 September 1791. In the six years that followed, two Portuguese officers - Rodrigo Antônio de Morais de Lamare and Pedro Antônio Nunes - who would later reach the rank of vice admiral in the Brazilian Navy both served on board of her. She was not a part of the royal fleet that crossed the Atlantic at first during the transfer of the Portuguese court to Brazil, as she was still in no condition to make the crossing.

She took part in the Portuguese campaigns in the Banda Oriental, escorting the convoy carrying the Royal Volunteers Division from Rio de Janeiro to Montevideo in June 1812 during the first invasion. On 27 October 1817, in the waters of the Río de la Plata off Colonia del Sacramento, she engaged the Argentine privateer Atrevido del Sud, crewed by 240 men and armed with sixteen 24-pounder and 4 18-pounder guns. An intense engagement followed, with the enemy vessel only striking its colors after a third of its crew had fallen in battle. Gaivota do Mar's captain, João Batista Lourenço da Silva, was commended by the commander of the Luso-Brazilian army Carlos Frederico Lecor for his success in the naval action.

Upon returning from the Banda Oriental campaign, she went through an overhaul, being remodeled, converted to a corvette and renamed Liberal in early 1822. In the first few months of the Brazilian War of Independence she took part mainly in troop transport escorts and dealing with mutiny attempts. The Liberal herself would have a mutiny attempt foiled on board on 17 September 1822, with 12 sailors being taken prisoner and escorted to the corvette Maria da Glória for imprisonment.

In 15 November, now officially under the Brazilian Imperial ensign, Liberal reached Montevideo, where she joined with David Jewett's fleet. They would reach Rio de Janeiro on 12 January 1823, being incorporated into the squadron led by Thomas Cochrane that would take part in the Battle of 4 May. After the inconclusive battle, she returned to Rio de Janeiro on 17 May and left towards Montevideo on 12 August, where the Brazilian commander, Pedro Antônio Nunes, made her his flagship. She was the first ship to open fire upon the defending Portuguese fleet in the naval battle off Montevideo, losing a mast during the battle but having an important role in the victory won.

In July 1825, she was made flagship of the First Division by Vice-Admiral Rodrigo Ferreira Lobo during the Cisplatine War. On 9 February 1826, she was damaged in the Battle of Punta Colares by enemy fire, but still took part in the battles of Colonia del Sacramento in 8 March and Banco Ortiz by 3 May. After Vice-Admiral Rodrigo Ferreira Lobo was relieved by Admiral Rodrigo Pinto Guedes, Liberal was assigned to the Second Division, tasked with patrolling the inner line of the blockade, between Colonia del Sacramento, Buenos Aires and Ensenada. She was present during the attack on Los Pozos in 11 June and during the Battle of Quilmes, where the Argentine flagship 25 de Mayo was sunk. Liberal also took part in the Battle of Monte Santiago in 7–8 April 1827.

In 1843, she was converted to a barracks for the Imperial Sailors Corps in the Port of Rio de Janeiro, and was decommissioned not long afterwards.

== See also ==
- List of historical ships of the Brazilian Navy
