= Estaleiro Mauá =

Coordinates: 22.8772°S 43.1283°W

Mauá Shipyard SA
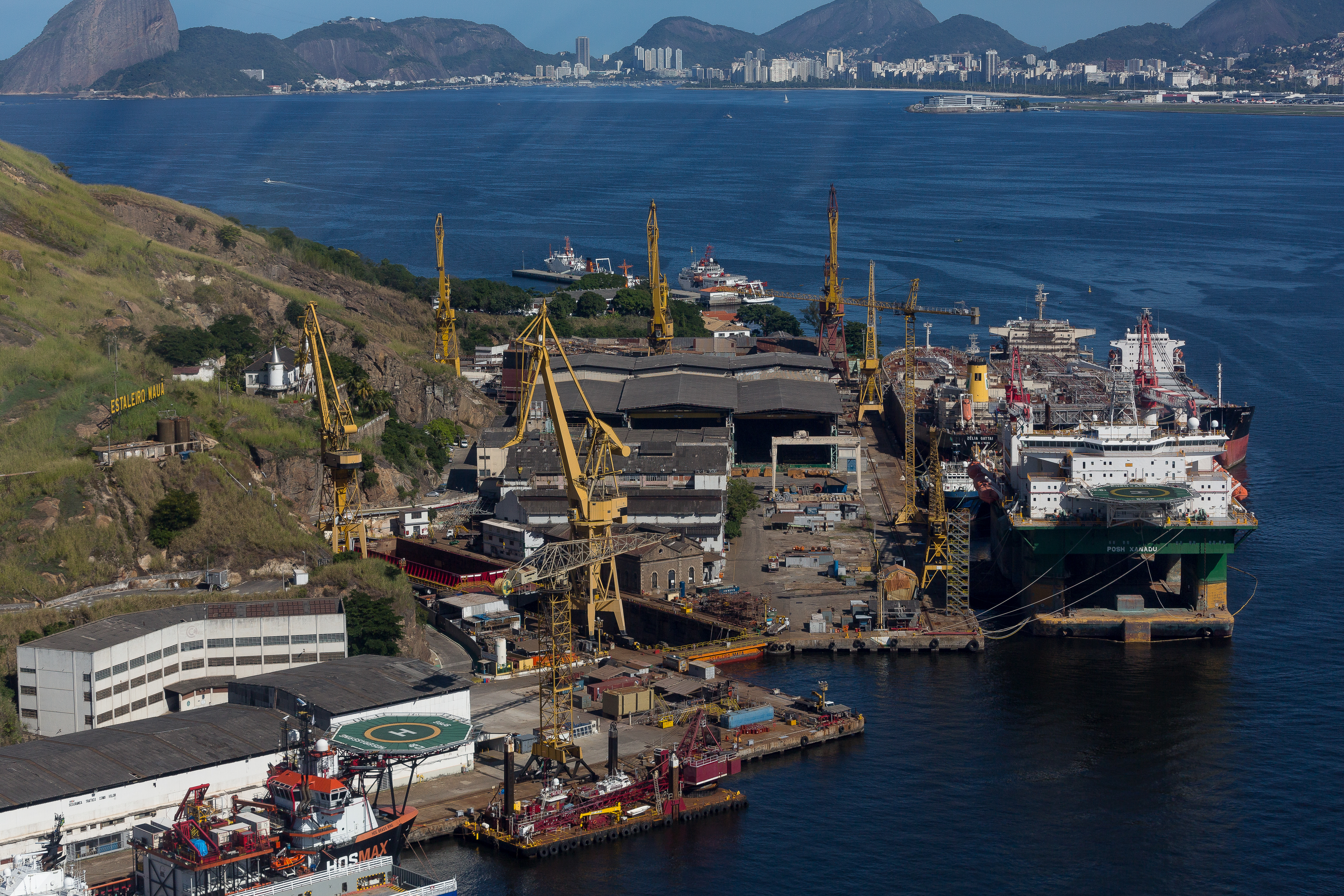
- Aerial view of Mauá Shipyard located in the city of Niterói, with Guanabara Bay in the background.
- Native name: Estaleiro Mauá
- Type: S.A.
- Industry: Shipbuilding, Defence
- Predecessor: Estabelecimento de Fundição e Estaleiros Ponta da Areia
- Founded: 1846; 180 years ago
- Headquarters: Niterói, Rio de Janeiro (state), Brazil
- Area served: Worldwide
- Key people: Irineu Evangelista de Sousa, Viscount of Mauá
- Products: Oil tanker, Oil platform, Patrol Boats, Fishing Vessels, Work boats, Platform supply vessels, Research vessels, Tugboats
- Services: Shipbuilding and services

Mauá Shipyard SA is the oldest private Brazilian shipyard, being surpassed only by the state-owned Arsenal da Marinha do Brasil, which was founded in 1808. Its origin is the Anglo-Brazilian company Estabelecimento de Fundição e Estaleiros da Ponta d'Areia, located in Niterói, Rio de Janeiro, and was bought on August 11, 1846, by Irineu Evangelista de Sousa, at the time Baron of Mauá.

In 2000, the company entered into a joint-venture with Jurong Shipyard in Singapore, creating the company Mauá Jurong S/A (MJ). The new company, in addition to the construction and repair of ships, specializes in the construction of platforms for oil and gas exploration.

The shipyard remains in operation, even with the crisis in Brazil.

== Recent vessel production ==
A not extensive list of Mauá's production:

Name	Launched	Size	Note
Celso Furtado	24 June 2010	48,300 DWT	Oil tanker
Rômulo Almeida	30 June 2011	48,300 DWT	Oil tanker
Sérgio Buarque de Holanda	7 July 2012	48,300 DWT	Oil tanker
José Alencar	14 January 2014	48,300 DWT	Oil tanker

== See also ==
- List of ships of the Brazilian Navy
- Arsenal de Marinha do Rio de Janeiro
- Ishikawajima do Brasil Estaleiros
