= Martim de Freitas =

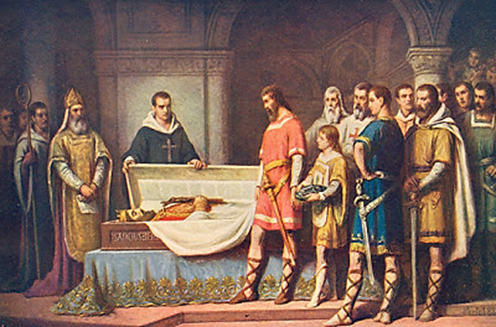
- Martim de Freitas opens the casket of King Sancho II
- Born: Coimbra, Kingdom of Portugal
- Died: 13th Century; Braga, Kingdom of Portugal.
- Noble family: du Puy
- Spouse: Elvira Gomes Pacheco
- Occupation: Fidalgo

Martim de Freitas (C.1200-?) was a Portuguese nobleman, Alcaide of the castle of Coimbra. He was vassal and confidant of Sancho II of Portugal.

== Biography ==
Born late 12th century in Portugal, son of Duarte and Olaia de Freitas, a noble lady, descendant of Ferdinand I of León. He used his mother's surname (Freitas), and all his descendants used the name Alpoim. His grandfather Duarte de Puy, had served in the Court of Sancho I.

Martim de Freitas served as Alcaide-mór de Coimbra, and was member to the court of Sancho II until his death. In 1248 he traveled to Toledo, Castile to verify the death of King.
