= Independence of Brazil =

Founding of independent Brazil

- Part of the Brazilian War of Independence
- Independence or Death, by Pedro Américo, depicting the Cry of Ipiranga on 7 September 1822, with Prince Pedro's Guard of Honor greeting him in support while some discard blue and white armbands that represented loyalty to Portugal.
- Date: 7 September 1822; 204 years ago
- Location: Brazil
- Participants: Pedro, Prince Royal; Princess Maria Leopoldina; José Bonifácio de Andrada e Silva
- Outcome: Independence of the Kingdom of Brazil from the United Kingdom of Portugal, Brazil and the Algarves and subsequent formation of the Empire of Brazil under Emperor Pedro I

The independence of Brazil (Portuguese: independência do Brasil) began after a series of political and military events that led the Kingdom of Brazil to separate from the United Kingdom of Portugal, Brazil and the Algarves. It is celebrated on 7 September, the date in 1822 when prince regent Pedro of Braganza, beside the Ipiranga brook, declared independence from Portugal – a declaration that became known as the Cry of Ipiranga. Formal recognition by Portugal came with the Treaty of Rio de Janeiro, signed in 1825.

In 1807, the French army invaded Portugal, which had refused to participate in the continental blockade against the United Kingdom. Unable to resist the invasion, the Portuguese royal family and government fled to Brazil, which was then the richest and most developed of the Portuguese colonies. The installation of the House of Appeals and other public bodies of the Portuguese government in Rio de Janeiro represented a series of political, economic and social transformations that led to then prince regent John of Braganza (later King John VI of Portugal), to elevate the State of Brazil to the status of a kingdom on 16 December 1815, united with its former metropole.

In 1820, a liberal revolution broke out in Portugal and the royal family was forced to return to Lisbon. Before leaving Brazil, however, the now king John VI named his eldest son, Pedro of Braganza, as prince regent of Brazil. Although Pedro was faithful to his father, the desire of the Portuguese courts to repatriate him (including demoting him from prince regent to governor-of-arms, that is, a mere military commander of the Portuguese Army, no longer holding any political position) and to return Brazil to its former colonial status led him to stay in Brazil and rebel.

During the war of independence that ensued – which began with the expulsion of the Portuguese troops from Pernambuco in 1821 – the Brazilian Army was formed by hiring mercenaries, enlisting civilians and some Portuguese colonial troops. The army immediately opposed the Portuguese forces, which controlled some parts of the country, namely, in the then provinces of Cisplatina (present-day Uruguay), Bahia, Piauí, Maranhão and Grão-Pará. At the same time that the conflict was taking place, a revolutionary movement broke out in Pernambuco and other neighboring provinces, which intended to form their own country, the Confederation of the Equator, with a republican government, but it was harshly repressed.

After four years of conflict, Portugal finally recognized Brazil's independence and the Treaty of Friendship and Alliance was signed between the two countries on 29 August 1825. In exchange for recognition as a sovereign state, Brazil committed to paying a substantial compensation to Portugal and signing two treaties with the United Kingdom by which it agreed to ban the Atlantic slave trade and grant preferential tariffs to British goods imported into the country.

Officially, the date celebrated for Brazil's independence is 7 September 1822, when the event known as the Cry of Ipiranga took place on the banks of the Ipiranga brook in the city of São Paulo. Prince Pedro of Braganza was acclaimed Emperor of Brazil on 12 October 1822, being crowned and consecrated on 1 December 1822, and the country became known as the Empire of Brazil.

== Background ==
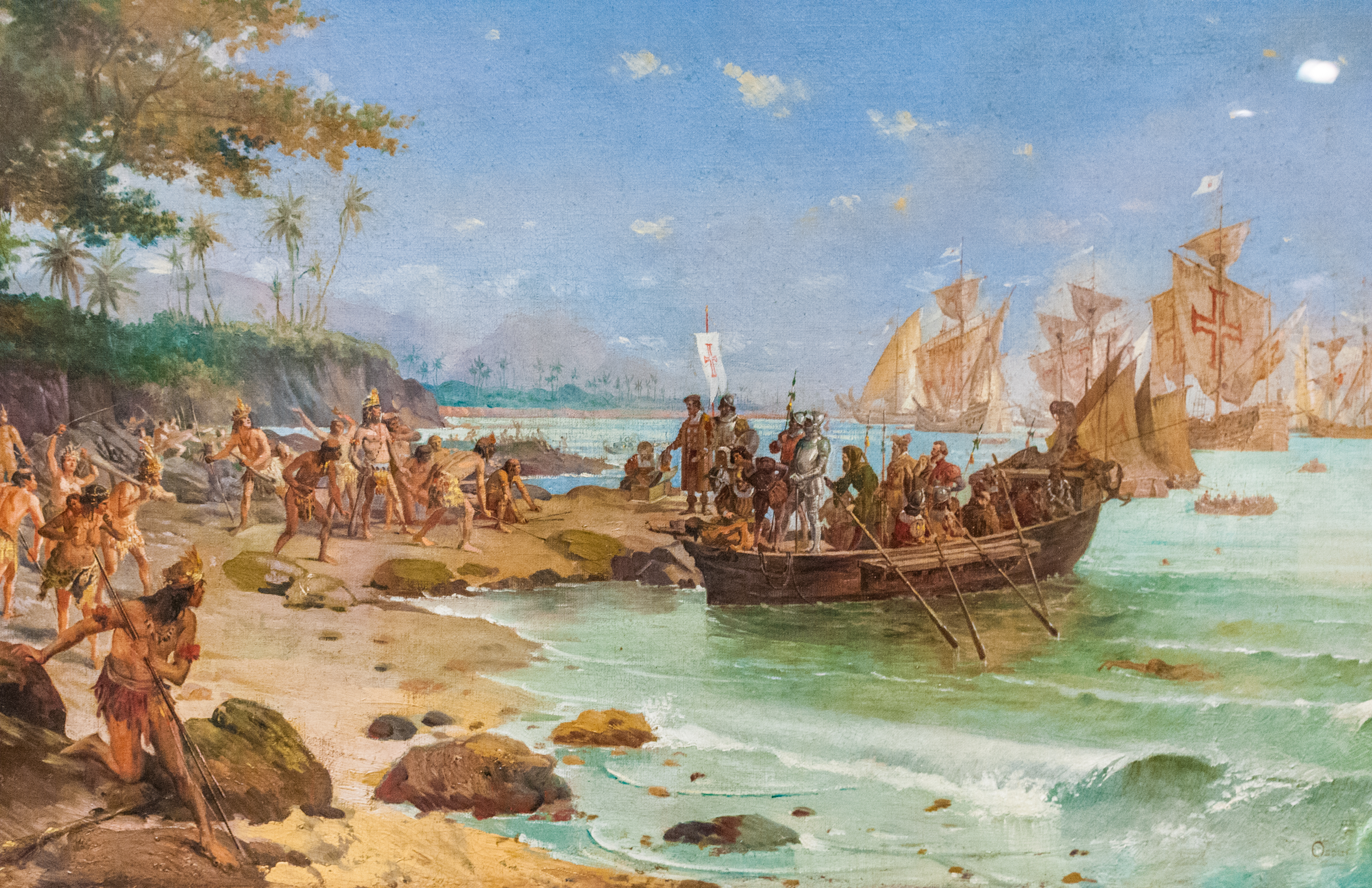
Landing of Pedro Álvares Cabral in Brazil, South America, April 1500.

The land now called Brazil was claimed by the Kingdom of Portugal in April 1500, on the arrival of the Portuguese naval fleet commanded by Pedro Álvares Cabral. The Portuguese encountered Indigenous peoples divided into several tribes, most of whom shared the same Tupi–Guarani language family, and shared and disputed territory. But the Portuguese, like the Spanish in their North American territories, had brought diseases with them against which many Indians were helpless due to lack of immunity. Measles, smallpox, tuberculosis, and influenza killed tens of thousands.

Though the first settlement was founded in 1532, colonization only effectively started in 1534 when King John III divided the territory into fifteen hereditary captaincies. This arrangement proved problematic, however, and in 1549 the king assigned a governor-general to administer the entire colony. The Portuguese assimilated some of the native tribes while others slowly disappeared in long wars or by European diseases to which they had no immunity.

By the mid-16th century, sugar had become Brazil's main export due to the increasing international demand. To profit from the situation, by 1700 over 963,000 enslaved Africans had been brought across the Atlantic Ocean to work in the plantations of Brazil. More Africans were brought to Brazil up until that date than to all the other places in the Americas (and the entire Western Hemisphere) combined.

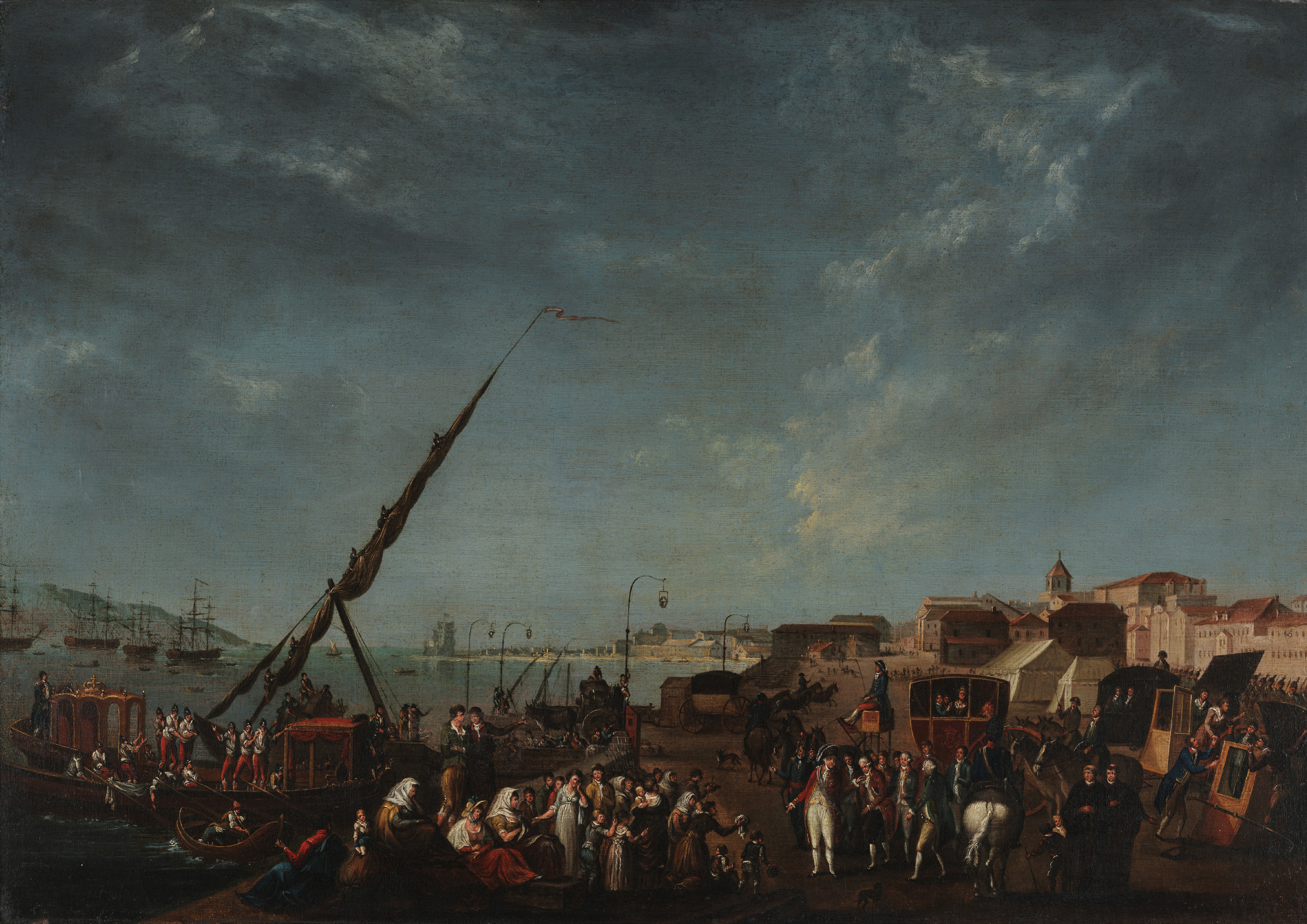
Departure of the Portuguese royal family of the House of Braganza to exile in Brazil on 29 November 1807, under pressure from French Emperor Napoleon I.

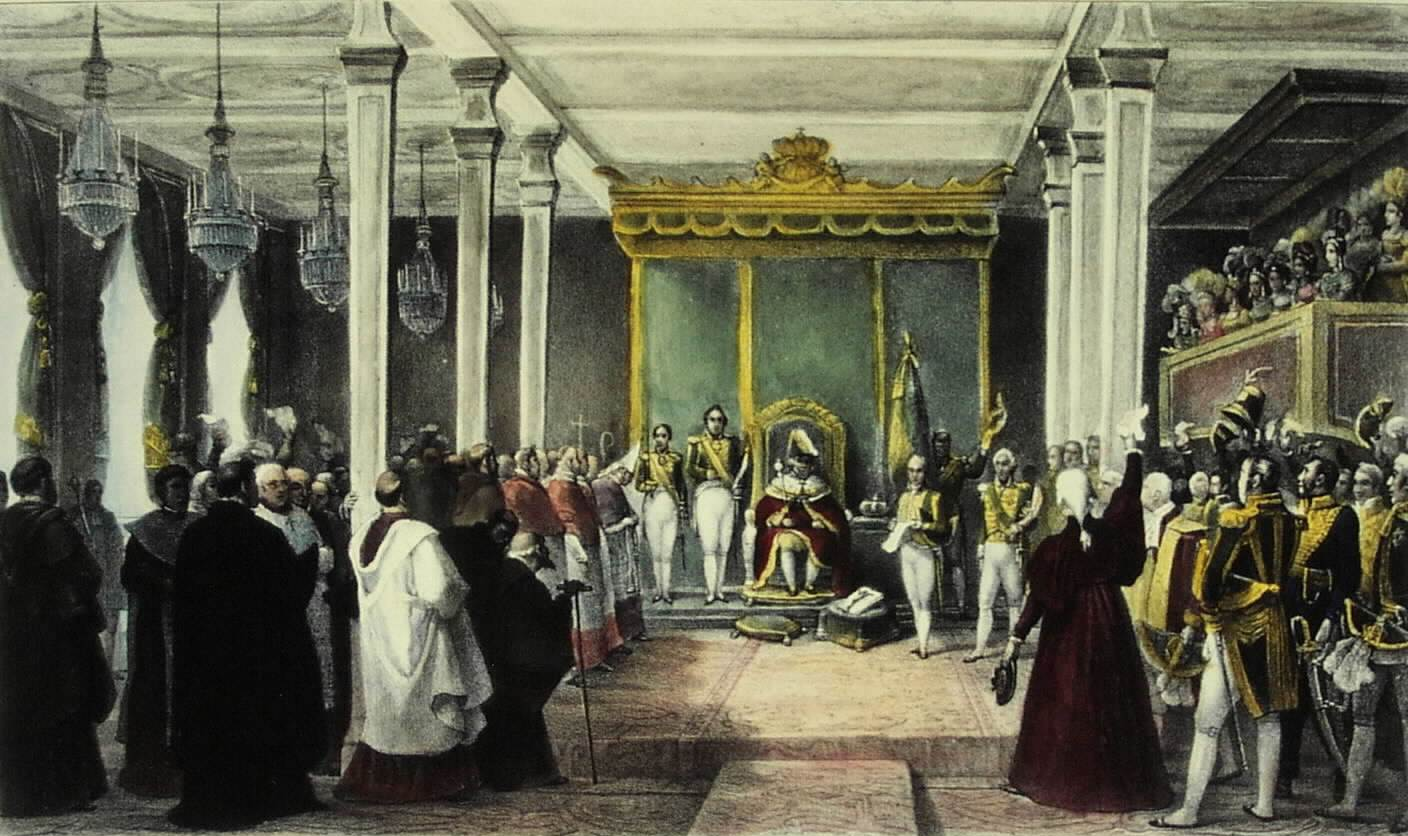
Acclamation ceremony of King John VI of the new United Kingdom of Portugal, Brazil and the Algarves in the Paço Real in Rio de Janeiro, temporary capital, Brazil, 6 February 1818.

Through wars against the French, the Portuguese slowly expanded their territory to the southeast, taking Rio de Janeiro in 1567, and to the northwest, taking São Luís in 1615. They sent military expeditions to the northwest of the South American continent to the Amazon River basin rainforest and conquered competing English and Dutch strongholds, founding villages and forts from 1669. In 1680 they reached the far southeast and founded Colônia do Sacramento on the bank of the Río de la Plata, in the Banda Oriental region (present-day Uruguay).

At the end of the 17th century, sugar exports started to decline, but beginning in the 1690s, the discovery of gold by explorers in the region that would later be called Minas Gerais, current Mato Grosso and Goiás saved the colony from imminent collapse. From all over Brazil, as well as from Portugal, thousands of immigrants came to the mines in an early gold rush.

The Spanish tried to prevent Portuguese expansion northwest, west, southwest and southeast into the territory that belonged to them according to the 1494 Treaty of Tordesillas division of the New World by the Bishop and Pope of Rome, Alexander VI (1431–1503, reigned 1492–1503) and succeeded in conquering the Banda Oriental region in 1777. However, this was in vain as the Treaty of San Ildefonso, signed in the same year, confirmed Portuguese sovereignty over all lands proceeding from its territorial expansion, thus creating most of the current Brazilian southeastern border.

During the French invasion of Portugal by Emperor Napoleon I in 1807, the Portuguese royal family (House of Braganza) fled across the Atlantic Ocean with the help of the British Royal Navy to Brazil, establishing Rio de Janeiro as the de facto capital of the Portuguese Empire during the ensuing worldwide Napoleonic Wars (1803–1815). This had the side effect of soon creating within Brazil many of the institutions required to exist as an independent state; most importantly, it freed Brazil to trade with other nations at will.

After Napoleon's Imperial French army was finally defeated at Waterloo in June 1815, in order to maintain the capital in Brazil and allay Brazilian fears of being returned to colonial status, King John VI of Portugal raised the de jure status of Brazil to an equal kingdom and integral part of the new United Kingdom of Portugal, Brazil and the Algarves, rather than a mere colony, a status which it enjoyed for the next seven years, appointing his son, Dom Pedro, as prince regent.

== Path to independence ==
=== Portuguese Cortes ===
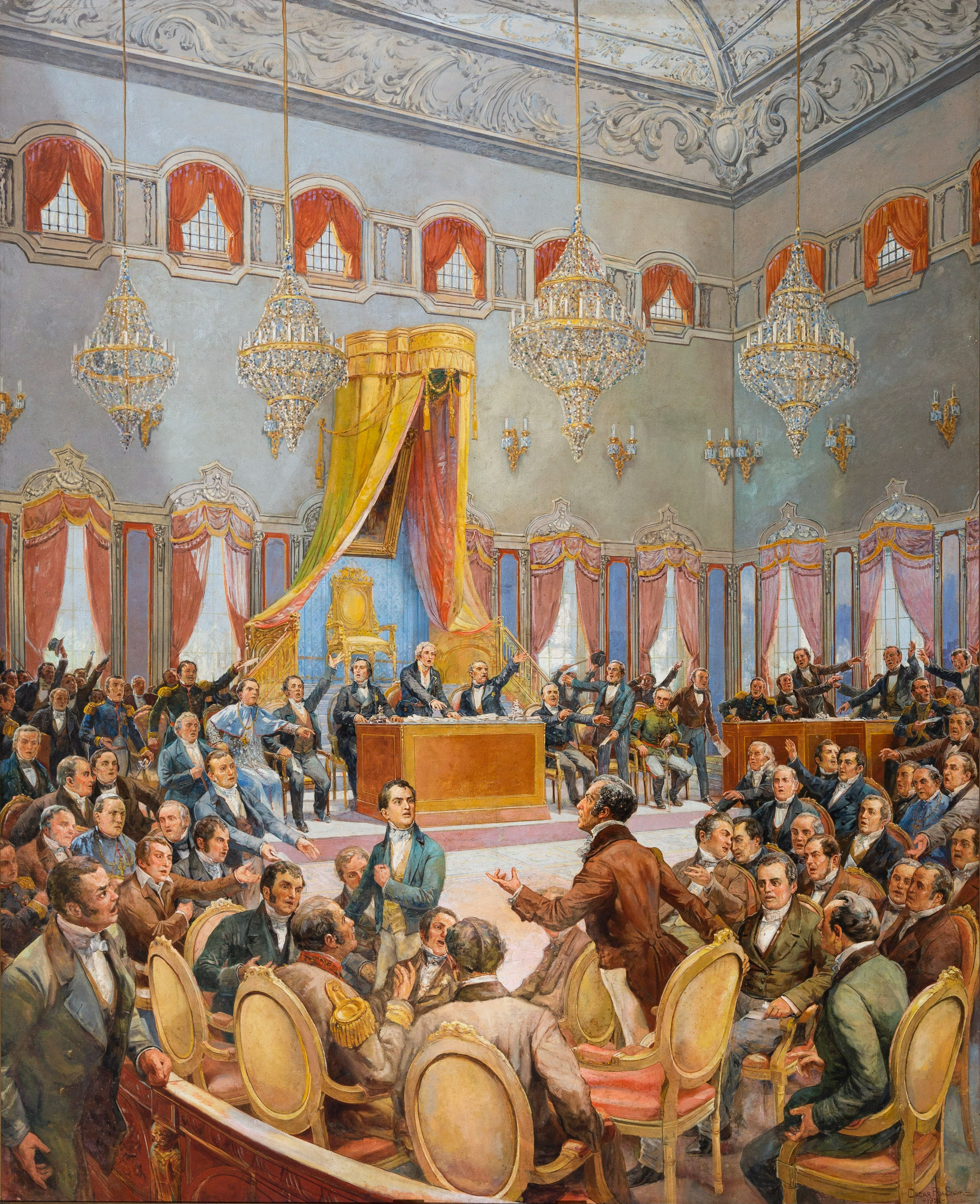
The Portuguese Cortes

In 1820 the Constitutionalist Revolution erupted in Portugal. The movement initiated by the liberal constitutionalists resulted in the meeting of the Cortes (or Constituent Assembly), that would have to create the kingdom's first constitution. The Cortes at the same time demanded the return of King Dom John VI, who had been living in Brazil since 1808, who elevated Brazil to a kingdom as part of the United Kingdom of Portugal, Brazil and the Algarves in 1815 and who nominated his son and heir prince Dom Pedro as regent, to govern Brazil in his place on 7 March 1821. The king left for Europe on 26 April, while Dom Pedro remained in Brazil governing it with the aid of the ministers of the Kingdom (Interior) and Foreign Affairs, of War, of Navy and of Finance.

The Portuguese military officers headquartered in Brazil were completely sympathetic to the Constitutionalist movement in Portugal. The main leader of the Portuguese officers, General Jorge de Avilez Zuzarte de Sousa Tavares, forced the prince to dismiss and banish from the country the ministers of Kingdom and Finance. Both were loyal allies of Pedro, who had become a pawn in the hands of the military. The humiliation suffered by the prince, who swore he would never yield to the pressure of the military again, would have a decisive influence on his abdication ten years later. Meanwhile, on 30 September 1821, the Cortes approved a decree that subordinated the governments of the Brazilian provinces directly to Portugal. Prince Pedro became for all purposes only the governor of Rio de Janeiro Province. Other decrees that came after ordered his return to Europe and also extinguished the judicial courts created by João VI in 1808.

Dissatisfaction over the Cortes measures among most residents in Brazil (both Brazilian-born and Portuguese-born) rose to a point that it soon became publicly known. Two groups that opposed the Cortes' actions to gradually undermine Brazilian sovereignty appeared: Liberals, led by Joaquim Gonçalves Ledo (with the support of the Freemasons), and the Bonifacians, led by José Bonifácio de Andrada. The factions, with quite different views of what Brazil could and should be, agreed only on their desire to keep Brazil co-equal with Portugal, united in a sovereign monarchy, rather than Brazil being merely provinces controlled from Lisbon.

=== Avilez rebellion ===
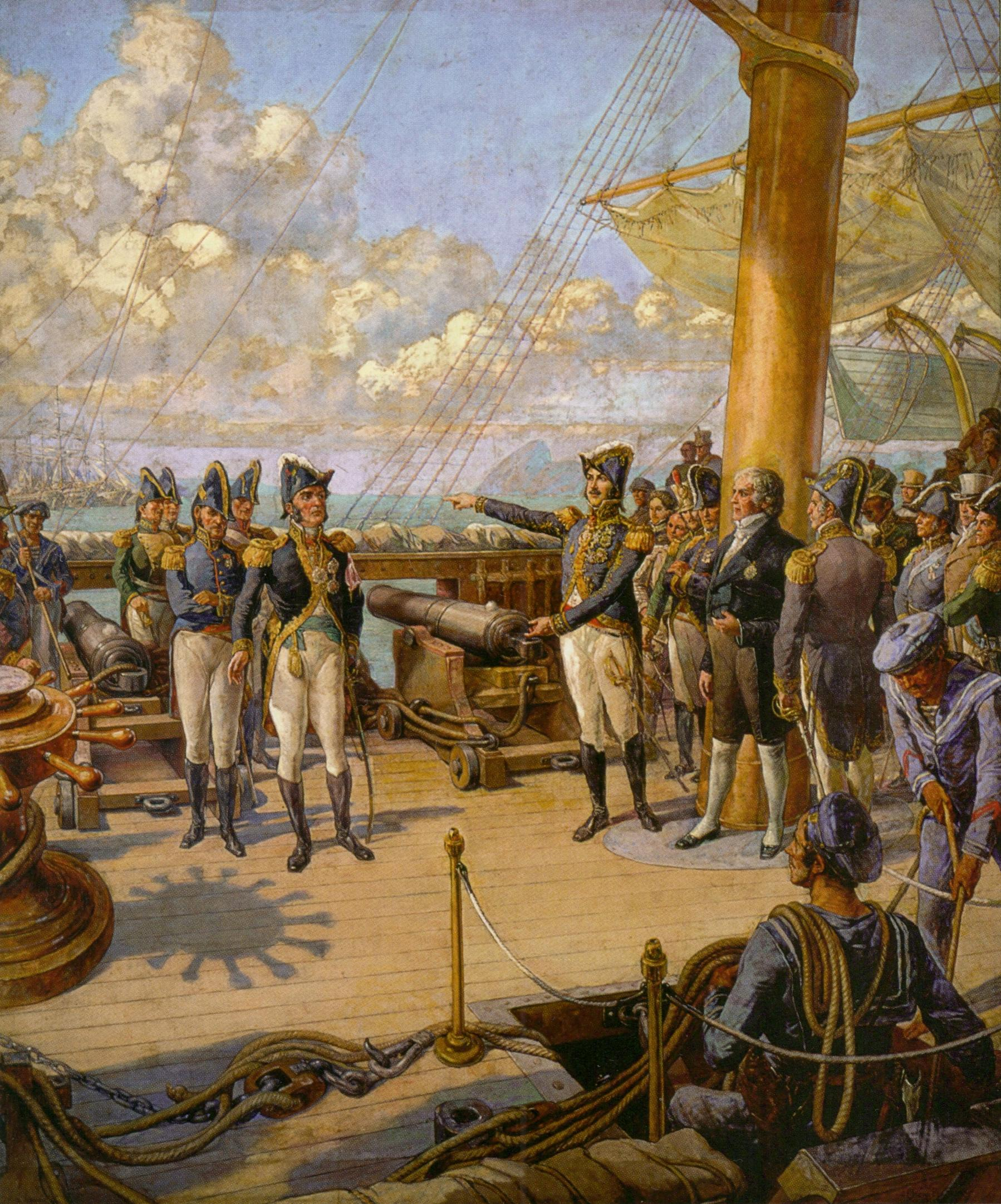
Prince Pedro (right, pointing) orders Portuguese officer Jorge de Avilez (left) to return to Europe after his failed rebellion, 8 February 1822. José Bonifácio (in civilian clothes) can be seen next to the prince regent.

The Portuguese members of the Cortes showed no respect towards Prince Pedro and openly mocked him. And so the loyalty that Pedro had shown towards the Cortes gradually shifted to the Brazilian cause. His wife, princess Maria Leopoldina of Austria, favoured the Brazilian side and encouraged him to remain in the country which the Liberals and Bonifacians openly called for. Pedro's reply to the Cortes came on 9 January 1822, when, according to newspapers, he said: "As it is for the good of all and for the nation's general happiness, I am ready: Tell the people that I will stay".

After Pedro's decision to defy the Cortes and remain in Brazil, around 2,000 men led by Jorge Avilez rioted before concentrating on mount Castelo, which was soon surrounded by 10,000 armed Brazilians, led by the Royal Police Guard. Dom Pedro then "dismissed" the Portuguese commanding general and ordered him to remove his soldiers across the bay to Niterói, where they would await transport to Portugal.

Jose Bonifácio was nominated minister of Kingdom and Foreign Affairs on 18 January 1822. Bonifácio soon established a fatherlike relationship with Pedro, who began to consider the experienced statesman his greatest ally. Gonçalves Ledo and the Liberals tried to minimize the close relationship between Bonifácio and Pedro, offering to the prince the title of Perpetual Defender of Brazil. For the Liberals, the creation of a Constituent Assembly to prepare a Brazilian constitution was necessary, while the Bonifacians preferred that Pedro create the constitution himself, to avoid the possibility of anarchy similar to the first years of the French Revolution.

The prince acquiesced to the Liberals’ desires, and signed a decree on 3 June 1822 calling for the election of deputies that would gather in a Constituent and Legislative General Assembly in Brazil.

=== From united kingdom under Portugal to independent empire ===
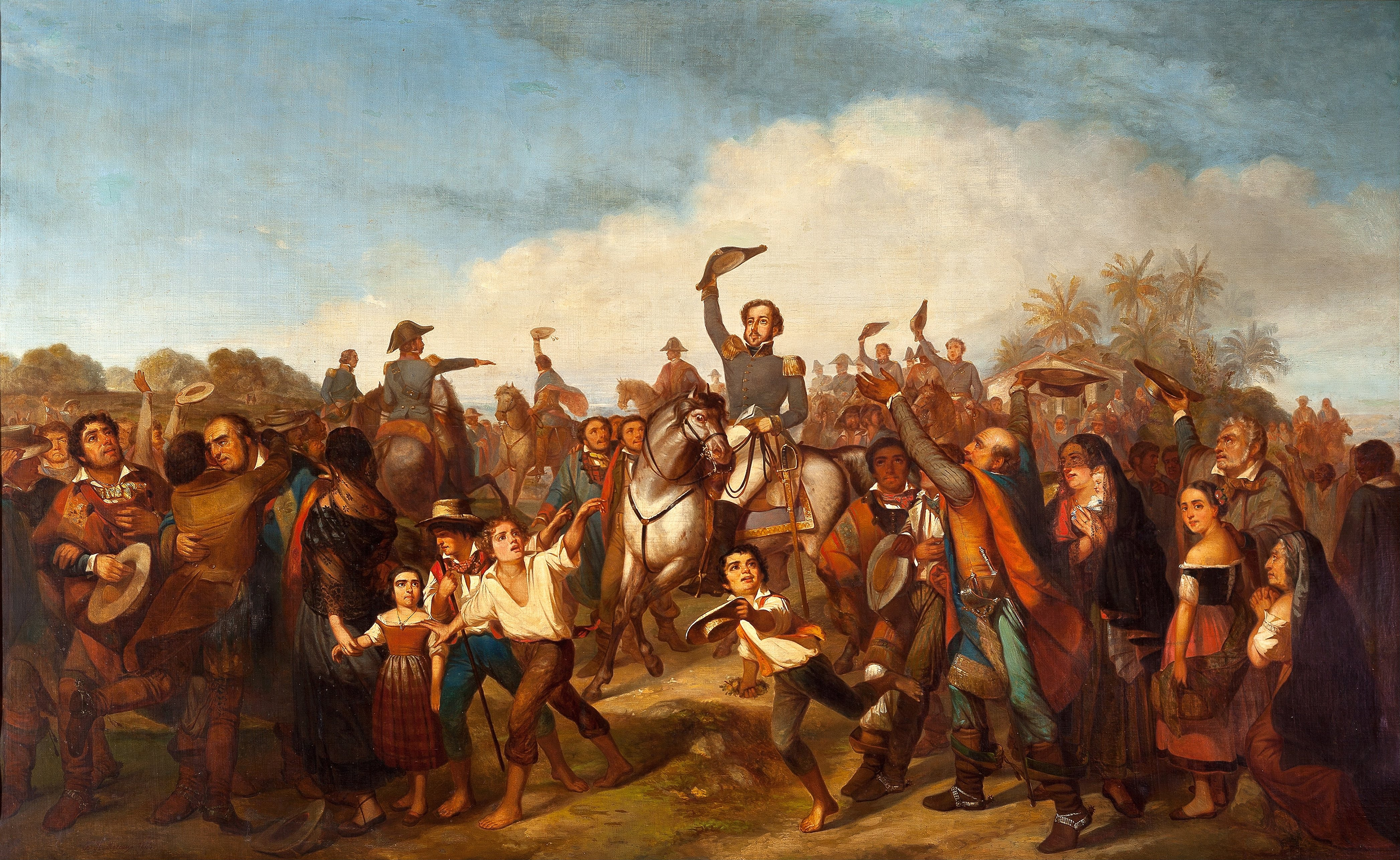
Prince Pedro is surrounded by a cheering crowd in São Paulo after giving the news of the Brazilian independence on 7 September 1822.

Pedro departed to São Paulo Province to secure the province's loyalty to the Brazilian cause. He reached its capital on 25 August and remained there until 5 September. While on his way back to Rio de Janeiro on 7 September he received at Ipiranga mail from José Bonifácio and his wife, Leopoldina. The letter told him that the Cortes had annulled all acts of the Bonifácio cabinet, removed Pedro's remaining powers, and ordered him to return to Portugal. It was clear that independence was the only option left, which his wife supported. Pedro turned to his companions, that included his Guard of Honor, and said: "Friends, the Portuguese Cortes want to enslave and pursue us. From today on our relations are broken. No ties can unite us anymore". He removed his blue-white armband that symbolized Portugal: "Armbands off, soldiers. Hail to the independence, to freedom and to the separation of Brazil from Portugal!" He unsheathed his sword affirming that "For my blood, my honor, my God, I swear to give Brazil freedom," and later cried out: "Brazilians, Independence or death!". This event is known as the "Cry of Ipiranga", the declaration of Brazil's independence,

Returning to the city of São Paulo on the night of 7 September 1822, Pedro and his companions announced the news of Brazilian independence from Portugal. The Prince was received with great popular celebration and was called not only "King of Brazil", but also "Emperor of Brazil".

Pedro returned to Rio de Janeiro on 14 September and in the following days the Liberals had distributed pamphlets (written by Joaquim Gonçalves Ledo) that suggested that the Prince should be named Constitutional Emperor. On 17 September the President of the Municipal Chamber of Rio de Janeiro, José Clemente Pereira, sent to the other Chambers of the country the news that the Acclamation would occur on Pedro's birthday, 12 October.

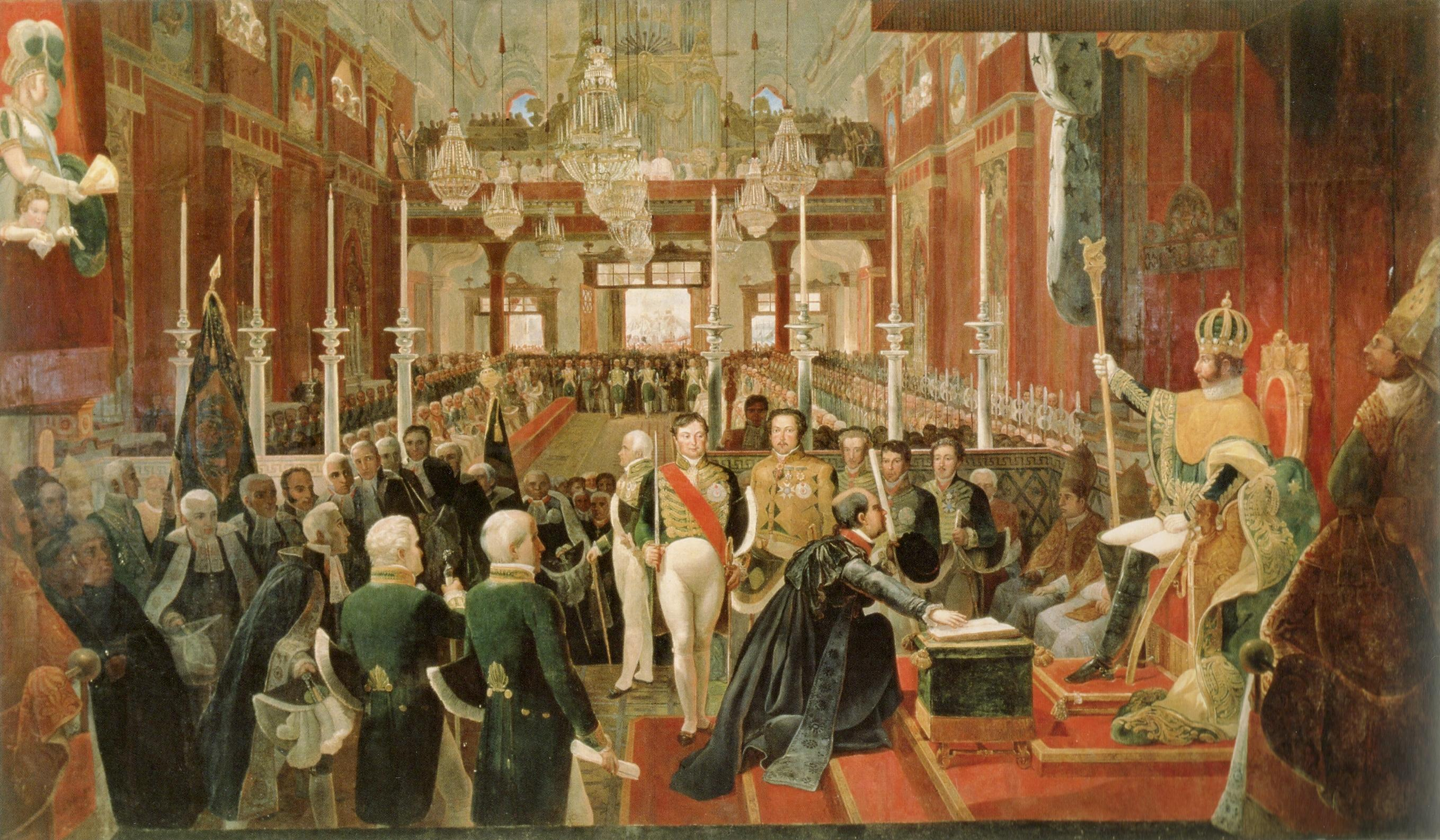
Coronation ceremony of Emperor Pedro I in the Imperial Chapel, 1 December 1822.

The official separation would only occur on 22 September 1822 in a letter written by Pedro to João VI. In it, Pedro still calls himself Prince Regent and his father is considered the King of the independent Brazil. On 12 October 1822, in the Field of Santana (later known as Field of the Acclamation) Prince Pedro was acclaimed Dom Pedro I, Constitutional Emperor and Perpetual Defender of Brazil. It was at the same time the beginning of Pedro's reign and also of the Empire of Brazil. However, the Emperor made it clear that although he accepted the emperorship, if João VI returned to Brazil he would step down from the throne in favor of his father.

The reason for the imperial title was that the title of king would symbolically mean a continuation of the Portuguese dynastic tradition and perhaps of the feared absolutism, while the title of emperor derived from popular acclamation as in Ancient Rome or at least reigning through popular sanction as in the case of Napoleon. On 1 December 1822, Pedro I was crowned and consecrated.

== International recognition ==
According to the Brazilian government and researcher Rodrigo Wiese Randig, the first country to recognize Brazil was the United Provinces of the Río de la Plata (today's Argentina), in June 1823, followed by the United States in May 1824, and the Kingdom of Benin in July 1824. However, according to historian Toby Green, the African states of Dahomey and Onim were the first two to recognize the new empire in 1822 and 1823 respectively. These states had traditionally maintained close diplomatic and economic contacts with South America.

== War of Independence ==
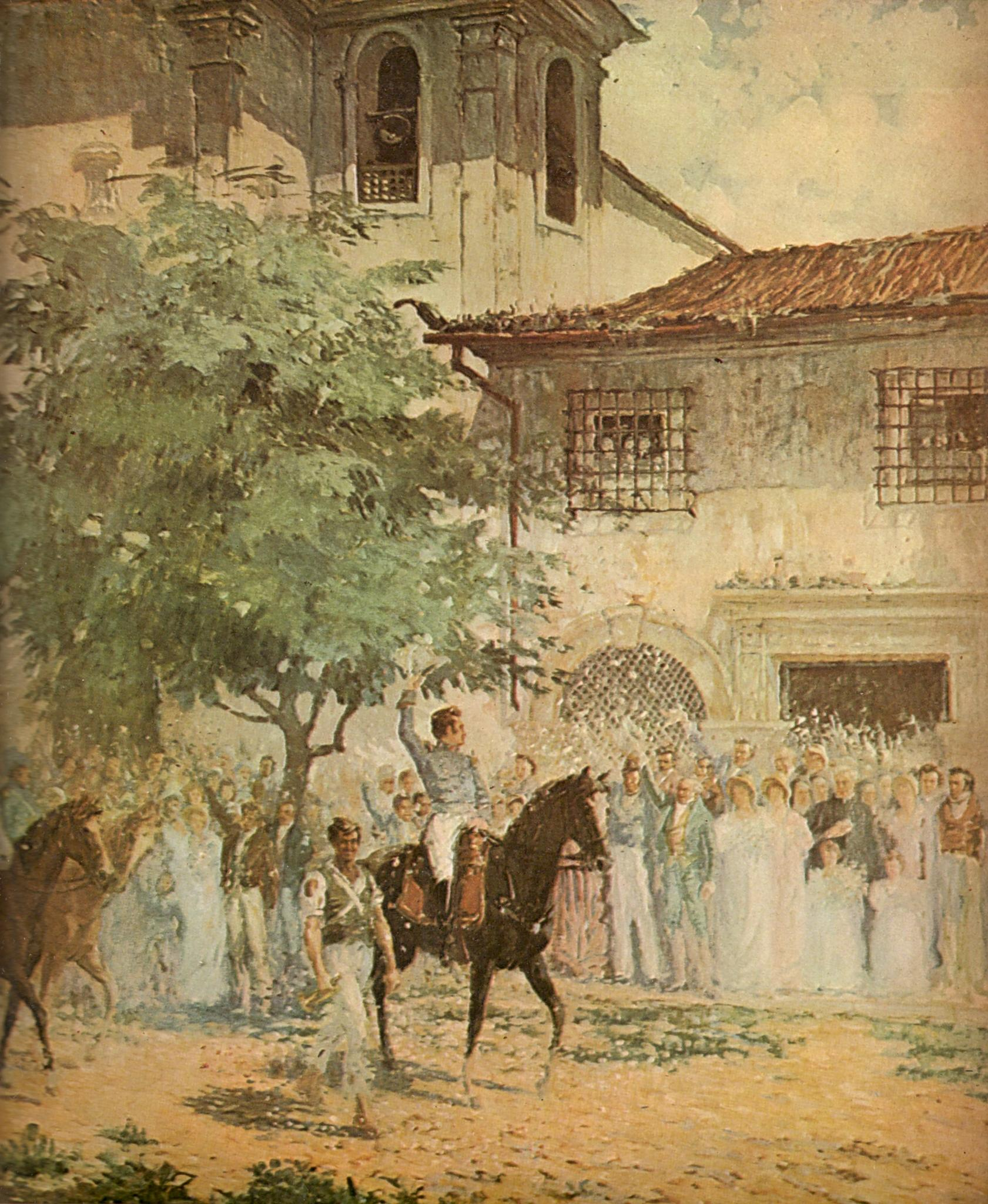
Triumphal entry of the Imperial Army into Salvador after the surrender of the Portuguese forces there in 1823.

Upon the declaration of the independence, the authority of the new regime only extended to Rio de Janeiro, São Paulo and the adjacent provinces. The rest of Brazil remained firmly under the control of Portuguese juntas and garrisons. It would take a war to put the whole of Brazil under Pedro's control. The fighting began with skirmishes between rival militias in 1822 and lasted until January 1824, when the last Portuguese garrisons and naval units surrendered or left the country.

Meanwhile, the Imperial government had to create a regular Army and Navy. Forced enlistment was widespread, extending to foreign immigrants, and Brazil made use of enslaved peoples in militias, as well as freeing enslaved peoples to enlist them in army and navy. The campaigns on land and sea covered the vast territories of Bahia, Cisplatina, Grão-Pará, Maranhão, Pernambuco, Ceará and Piauí.

By 1822, Brazilian forces were firmly in control of Rio de Janeiro and the central area of Brazil. Loyal militias began insurrections in the aforementioned territories, but strong, and regularly reinforced Portuguese garrisons in the port cities of Salvador, Montevideo, São Luís and Belém continued to dominate the adjacent areas and to pose the threat of a reconquest that the irregular Brazilian militias and guerrilla forces, which were loosely besieging them by land supported by newly created units of the Brazilian army, would be unable to prevent.

For the Brazilians, the answer to this stalemate was to seize control of the sea. Eleven former Portuguese warships, great and small, had fallen into Brazilian hands in Rio de Janeiro and these formed the basis of a new navy. The problem was manpower: the crews of these ships were largely Portuguese who were openly mutinous, and although many Portuguese naval officers had declared allegiance to Brazil their loyalty could not be relied on. The Brazilian Government solved the problem by recruiting 50 officers and 500 seamen in secret in London and Liverpool, many of them veterans of the Napoleonic Wars, and appointed Thomas Cochrane as commander-in-chief. On 1 April 1823, a Brazilian squadron of 6 ships sailed for Bahia. After an initial disappointing engagement with a superior Portuguese fleet, Cochrane blockaded Salvador. Deprived now of supplies and reinforcements by sea and besieged by the Brazilian army on land, on 2 July the Portuguese forces abandoned Bahia in a convoy of 90 ships. Leaving the frigate ‘Niteroi’ under Captain John Taylor to harry them to the coasts of Europe, Cochrane then sailed north to São Luís (Maranhão). There he tricked the Portuguese garrison into evacuating Maranhão by pretending that a huge Brazilian fleet and army were over the horizon. He then sent Captain John Pascoe Grenfell to play the same trick on the Portuguese in Belém do Pará at the mouth of the Amazon. By November 1823, the whole of the north of Brazil was under Brazilian control, and the following month, the demoralized Portuguese also evacuated Montevideo and the Cisplatine Province. By 1824, Brazil was free of all enemy troops and was de facto independent.

There are still today no reliable statistics related to the numbers of, for example, the total of the war casualties. However, based upon historical registration and contemporary reports of some battles of this war as well as upon the admitted numbers in similar fights that happened in these times around the globe, and considering how long the Brazilian independence war lasted (22 months), estimates of all killed in action on both sides are placed from around 5,700 to 6,200.

=== In Pernambuco ===
- Siege of Recife

=== In Piauí and Maranhão ===
- Battle of Jenipapo
- Siege of Caxias

=== In Grão-Pará ===
- Siege of Belém

=== In Bahia ===
- Battle of Pirajá
- Battle of Itaparica
- Battle of 4 May
- Siege of Salvador

=== In Cisplatina ===
- Siege of Montevideo

== Peace treaty and aftermath ==
The last Portuguese soldiers left Brazil in 1824. The Treaty of Rio de Janeiro recognizing Brazil's independence was signed by Brazil and Portugal on 29 August 1825.

The Brazilian aristocracy had its wish: Brazil made a transition to independence with comparatively little disruption and bloodshed. But this meant that independent Brazil retained its colonial social structure: monarchy, slavery, large landed estates, monoculture, an inefficient agricultural system, a highly stratified society, and a free population that was 90 percent illiterate.

== See also ==
- Empire of Brazil
- Colonial Brazil
- Cry of Ipiranga
- History of Brazil
- Treaty of Rio de Janeiro (1825)
- Independence Day (Brazil)
