= Brazilian War of Independence =

1822–1825 war between Portugal and Brazil

- Part of the decolonization of the Americas
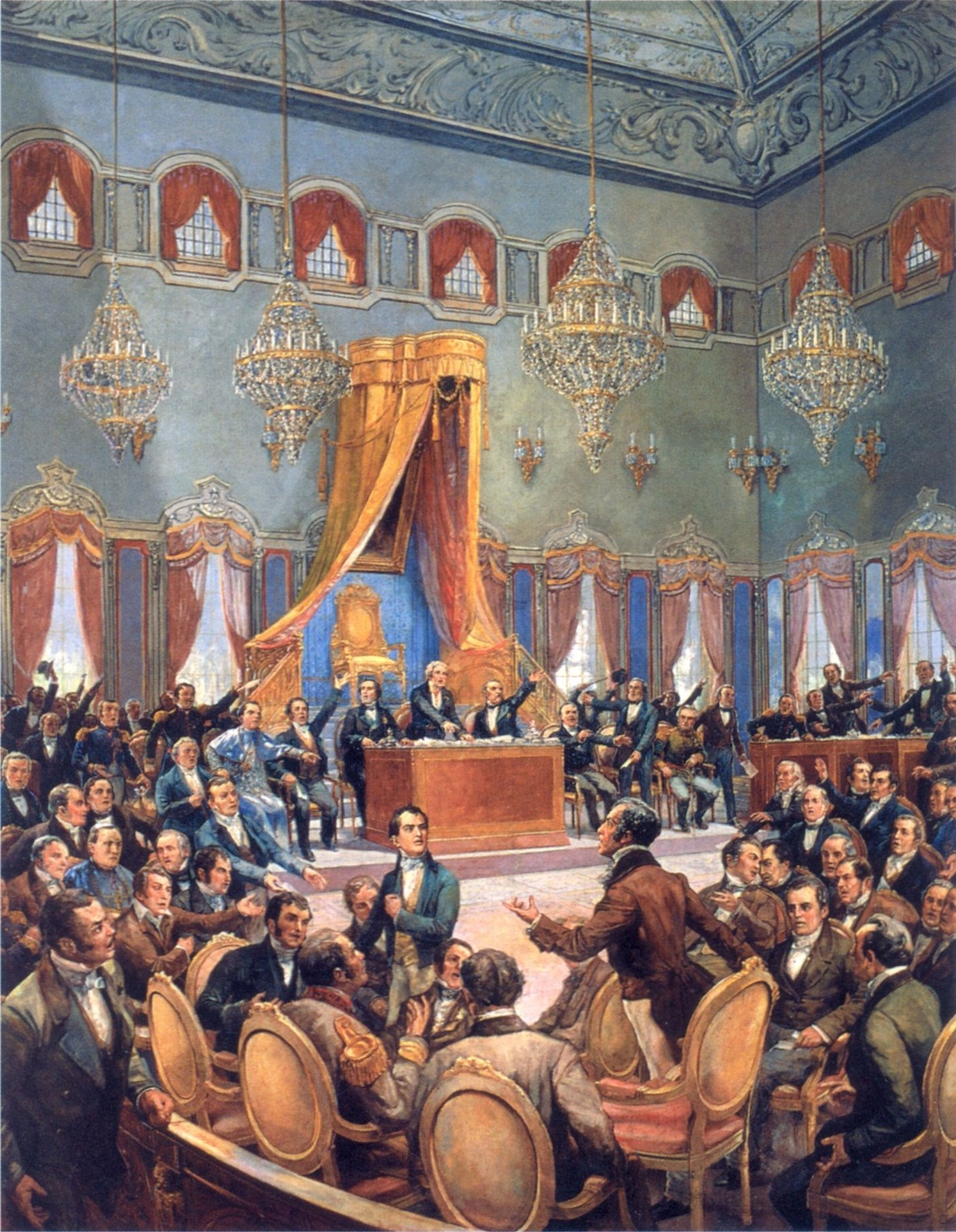
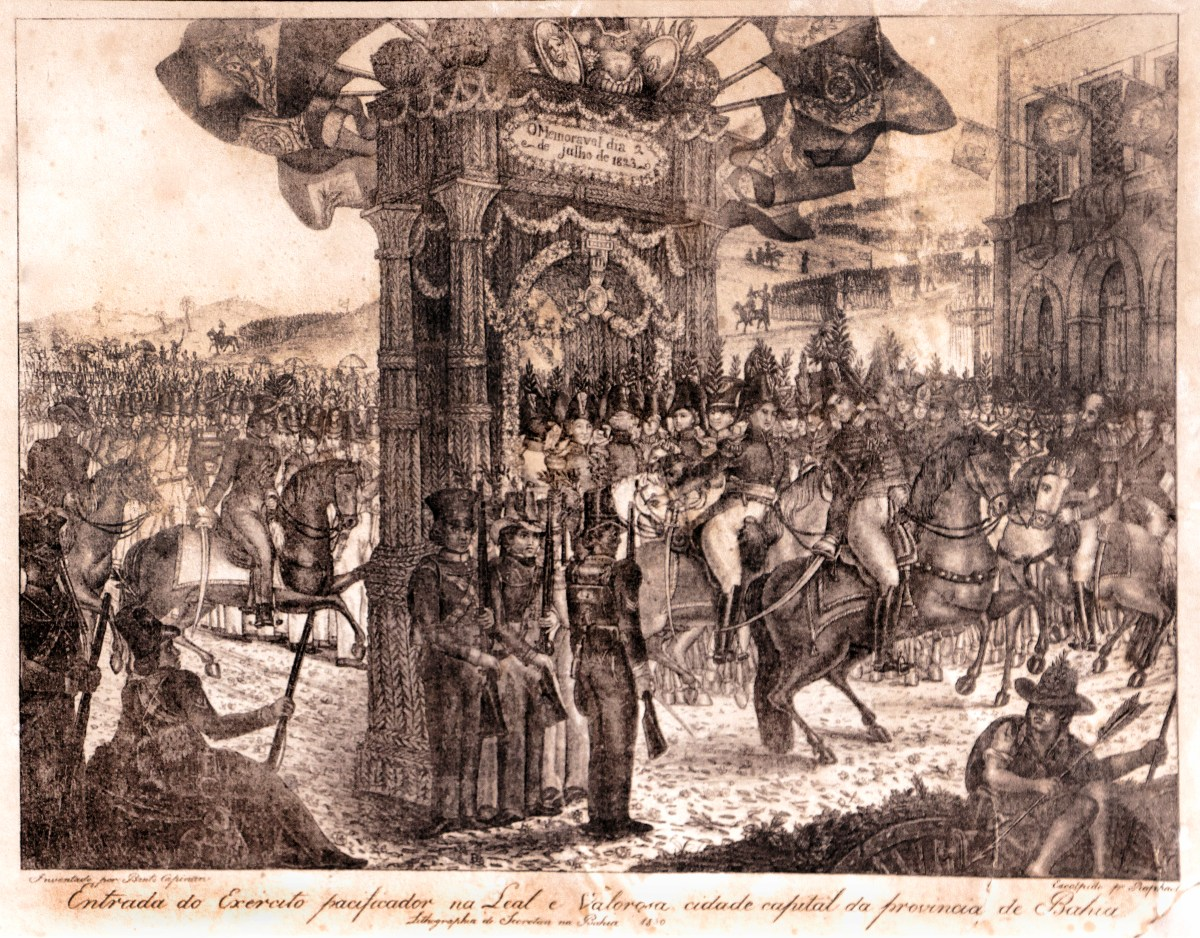
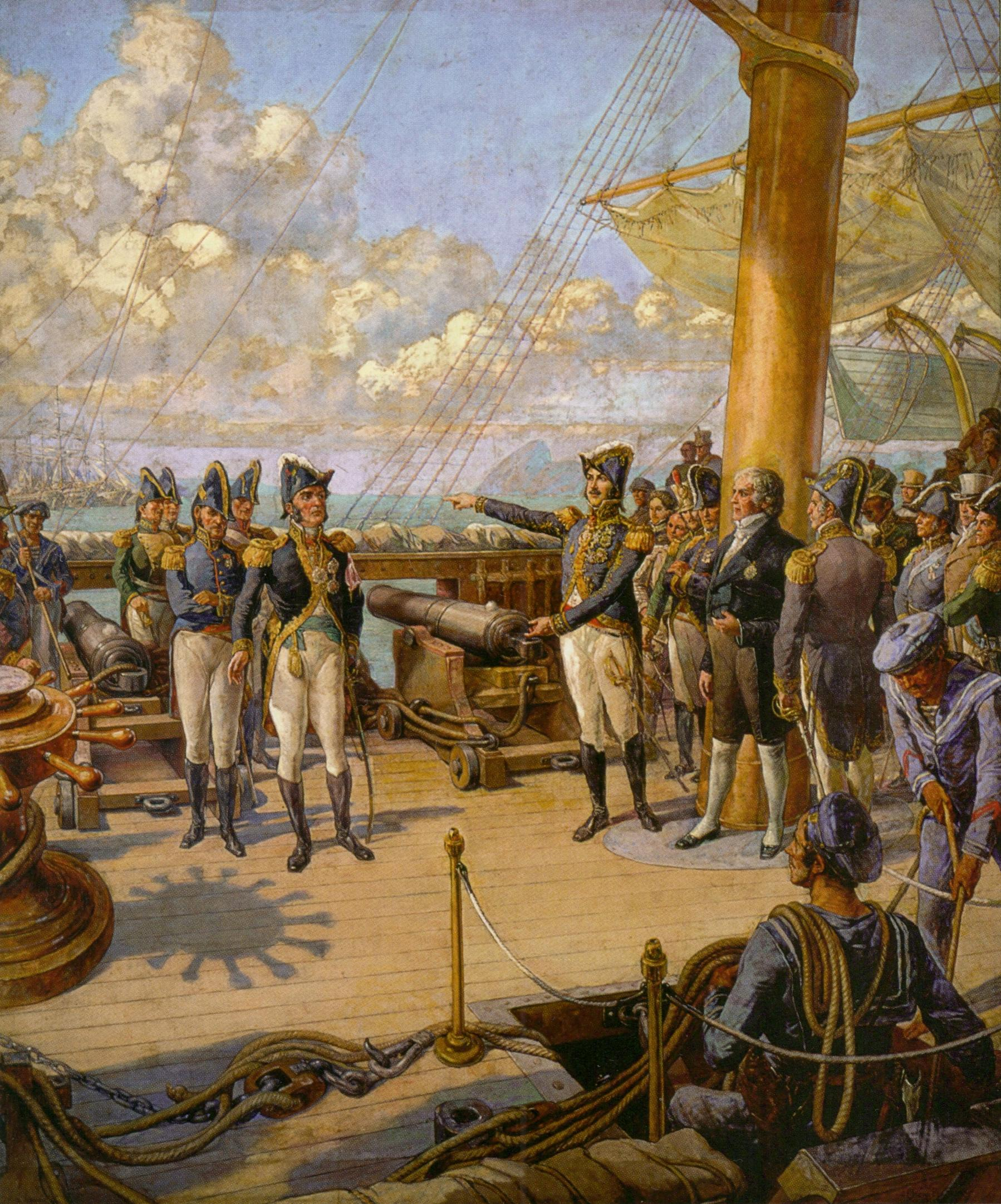
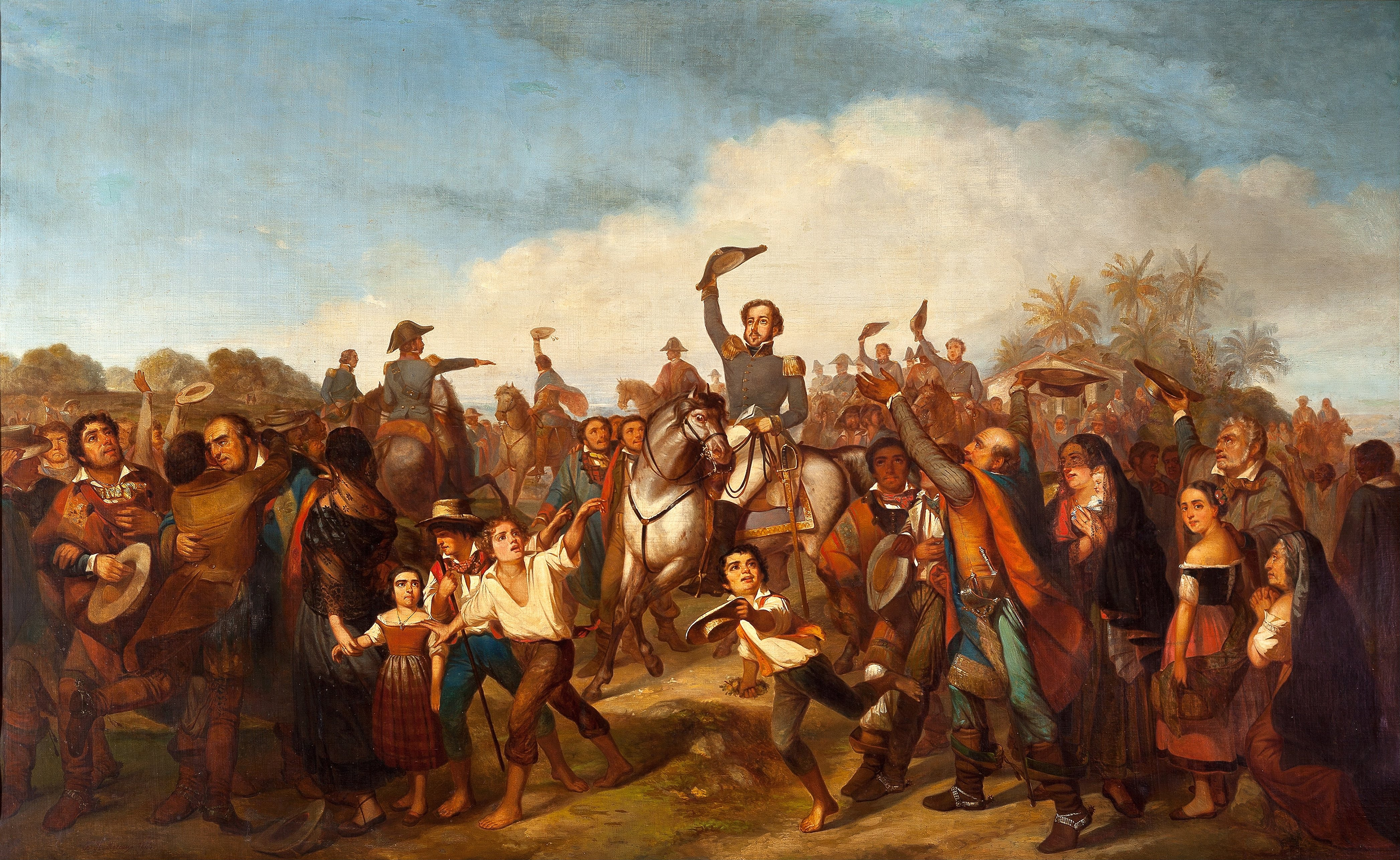
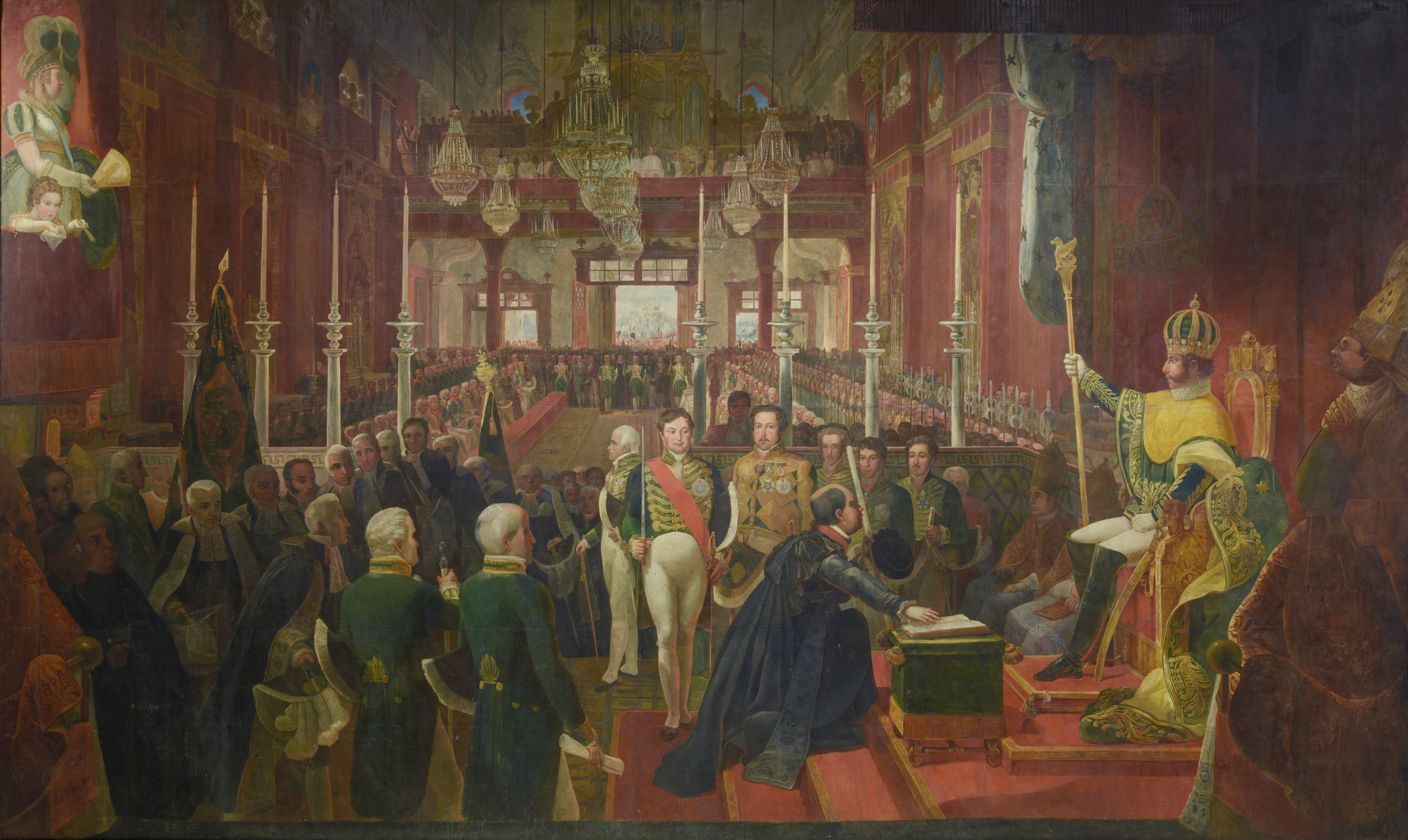
- Clockwise from top-left: The Portuguese Cortes; Triumphal entry into Salvador; Avilez surrendering to Pedro I aboard the frigate União; Pedro I declares the Independence of Brazil; Pedro I crowned Emperor of Brazil
Date	1 August 1822 – 29 August 1825 (3 years and 4 weeks)
Location	Brazil (including modern-day Uruguay)
Result	Independentist victory: Treaty of Rio de Janeiro

Belligerents
Independentists Kingdom of Brazil (from 7 September 1822 until 12 October 1822) Empire of Brazil (from 12 October 1822)	Loyalists United Kingdom of Portugal, Brazil and the Algarves

Commanders and leaders
Pedro I; Joaquim Curado; Baron of Laguna; Viscount of Magé; Viscount of Pirajá; Thomas Cochrane; John Pascoe Grenfell; Pierre Labatut	John VI; Madeira de Melo; Jorge de Avilez; Luís do Rego; Cunha Fidié; Álvaro de Macedo; Luís d'Oliveira; José M. de Moura

Units involved
Imperial Army; Imperial Navy; Brazilian militia	Portuguese Army; Portuguese Navy

Strength
Army and militia: ~30,000–40,000; Navy: 28 ships (1823); 48 ships (1824); 65 ships (1825); Marines: 3,000	Army: ~20,000; Navy: 55 ships

Casualties and losses
- 3,000–5,000 killed 6,000–10,000 wounded and captured 62 Portuguese ships captured

The Brazilian War of Independence (Portuguese: Guerra de Independência do Brasil) was an armed conflict that led to the separation of Brazil from the United Kingdom of Portugal, Brazil and the Algarves. The war was fought across various regions of Brazil, including Bahia, Maranhão, Pará, Piauí, and Cisplatina (present-day Uruguay), with naval battles occurring along the Atlantic coast. Brazilian forces, consisting of regular troops, local militias, and a hastily assembled fleet, defeated the Portuguese garrisons to establish the Empire of Brazil under emperor Pedro I. The war formally ended with the Treaty of Rio de Janeiro in 1825, in which Portugal recognized Brazil's independence.

After the outbreak of the Liberal Revolution in 1820, which forced king John VI to return to Portugal in 1821 after more than a decade in Rio de Janeiro, tensions between local Brazilian elites and the Portuguese Cortes arose. During his stay in Brazil, John VI had elevated the colony to the status of a kingdom in union with Portugal. The changes allowed Brazil to have its own government institutions and directly trade with the rest of the world, which many elites sought to preserve. Efforts by the Portuguese Cortes to restore Brazil to its former colonial status and reduce its political autonomy were met with resistance in various provinces. The tensions culminated in prince regent Pedro of Braganza's proclamation of independence on 7 September 1822, in what became known as the Cry of Ipiranga. Northern provinces, such as Bahia, Maranhão, and Pará, which maintained stronger ties with Portugal than the government in Rio de Janeiro, resisted Brazilian sovereignty, with Portuguese garrisons keeping control of key cities such as Salvador, São Luís, Belém, and Montevideo, in the South.

Under the command of French general Pierre Labatut, supported by British admiral Thomas Cochrane at sea, the Brazilian Army, consisting of regular troops, militia, and volunteers, gradually isolated the Portuguese forces in Bahia, where the siege of Salvador ended with the surrender of approximately 10,000 Portuguese troops on 2 July 1823. On the northern front, Cochrane secured the surrender of Maranhão and Pará. Troops were recruited from various provinces and social classes, and also included slaves who were promised freedom in exchange for military service. The Brazilian Army faced logistical difficulties, poor training, and internal disputes between commanders, particularly in the early stages of the war. In turn, the Imperial Navy disrupted Portuguese supply lines, prevented the arrival of reinforcements from Europe, and captured several enemy vessels. In total, Brazilian troops numbered between 30,000 and 40,000 men, while Portuguese ones numbered around 20,000.

The conflict officially ended with the Treaty of Rio de Janeiro, mediated by the United Kingdom, in which Brazil committed to paying Portugal an indemnity of 2 million pounds and grant trade privileges to the United Kingdom. Through the war, Brazil secured its territorial unity and established itself as a constitutional monarchy, in contrast with the fragmented neighboring republics that emerged from the Spanish American Wars of Independence.

== Opposing forces ==
The population of Colonial Brazil at the turn of the 19th century was 3.4 million. 60% of them were free men, mostly of Portuguese descent.

It is difficult to say how many Reinóis (those born in Portugal) lived in Brazil in 1822, since all inhabitants were subjects of Portugal. The majority of the population lived near the Atlantic Ocean, mainly in the provinces of Pernambuco, Bahia and Minas Gerais. These three regions dominated economic and political life of the colony. The Pernambuco region thrived by producing sugar, a crop of great value at the time. The southern Bahia region produced sugar, cotton, tobacco and molasses. It was the most densely populated and richest region. Further south was Rio de Janeiro, which controlled the gold and diamond production of Minas Gerais.

The Portuguese army in Brazil consisted of professional troops and militiamen. All officers were appointed by the Court of Lisbon. In 1817, a Republican revolt broke out in Pernambuco. As a result, 2,000 soldiers of the "Auxiliary Division" were sent to Brazil. With the arrival of the troops, native officers in Brazil were not given many responsibilities.

At the start of the war, there were about 10,000 Portuguese soldiers and units of the royal cavalry along the Atlantic coast. About 3,000 soldiers were later besieged in Montevideo. A similar number of soldiers occupied Salvador and the rest of the troops were scattered throughout Brazil.

== History ==
=== Start of the war ===
During late 1821 and early 1822, the inhabitants of Brazil took sides in the political upheavals that took place in Rio de Janeiro and Lisbon. Fights between Portuguese soldiers and local militias broke out in the streets of the main cities in 1822 and quickly spread inland, despite the arrival of reinforcements from Portugal. The Portuguese reinforcements summoned to Rio numbered nearly two thousand, but ultimately withdrew in the interest of minimizing damages and casualty to the estimated ten thousand militiamen surrounding them upon their arrival.

There was a split in the Luso-Brazilian Army which was garrisoned in the Cisplatina province (modern-day Uruguay). Portuguese regiments retreated to Montevideo and were besieged by Brazilians, led by the Baron of Laguna (himself a Portuguese, but, as many other aristocrats, on the side of Brazilian independence). One such aristocrat, José Bonifácio de Andrada e Silva, was responsible for proliferating Luso-Brazilian views on diplomacy and political structure. Pedro I, with the guidance of José Bonifácio de Andrada e Silva as chief minister, assembled a constituent congress for Brazil appealing to the constitutionalist sentiments amongst independence-minded Brazilians. This gesture was enough to persuade the Cortes in Lisbon to negotiate exclusive terms of trade in recognition of their independence, which was met with ridicule from Pedro. Pedro declared Brazil completely independent of Portugal on 7 September 1822. Shortly after, in December, Pedro would assume the role of authority as Emperor Pedro I of Brazil.

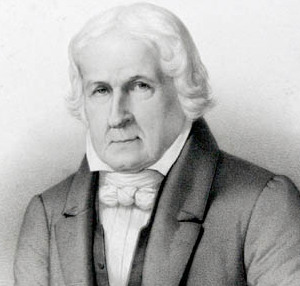
José Bonifácio de Andrada e Silva, the "patriarch of independence" in Brazil

The remote and sparsely populated northern provinces of Pará and Maranhão declared loyalty to Portugal. Pernambuco was in favor of independence, but in Bahia there was no consensus among the population. By the war's end, Bahia would see the most extensive combat throughout the conflict, but at this time its influence was paramount to the Portuguese effort for securing political interests in surrounding regions. While Portuguese forces were able to stop the local militias in certain cities, including Salvador, Montevideo and São Luís, they failed to defeat the militias in most of the other cities and proved ineffective against the guerrilla forces in the rural areas of the country.

Supporters of Brazilian Independence created and enlarged the Brazilian Army Navy by forced enlistment of citizens, foreign immigrants and mercenaries. They enlisted Brazilian slaves into militias and also freed slaves in order to enlist them in the army and the navy.

By 1823, the Brazilian Army had grown, replacing its early losses in terms of both personnel and supplies. The remaining Portuguese forces, already on the defensive, were rapidly running out of both manpower and supplies. Outnumbered across a vast territory, the Portuguese were forced to restrict their sphere of action to the provincial capitals along the shore that represented the country's strategic sea ports, including Belém, Montevideo, Salvador and São Luís.

Flag of the Empire of Brazil at the proclamation of independence.

=== Naval action ===
Both parties (Portuguese and Brazilian) saw the Portuguese warships spread across the country (mostly in poor condition) as the instrument through which military victory could be achieved. In early 1822, the Portuguese navy controlled a ship of the line, two frigates, four corvettes, two brigs, and four warships of other categories in Brazilian waters.

Warships available immediately for the new Brazilian navy were numerous, but in disrepair. The hulls of several ships that were brought by the Royal Family and the Court to be abandoned in Brazil were rotten and therefore of little value. Some underwent repairs and saw action in the war, however, such as the ship of the line Pedro I. The Brazilian agent in London, Felisberto Caldeira Brant, the Marquis of Barbacena, received orders to acquire warships fully equipped and manned on credit. No vendor, however, was willing to take the risks. Finally, there was an initial public offering, and the new Emperor personally signed for 350 of them, inspiring others to do the same. Thus, the new government was successful in raising funds to purchase a fleet.

Arranging crews was another problem. A significant number of former officers and Portuguese sailors volunteered to serve the new nation, and swore loyalty to it. Their loyalty, however, was under suspicion. For this reason, British officers and sailors were recruited to fill out the ranks and end the dependence on the Portuguese.

The Brazilian Navy was led by British officer Thomas Cochrane. The newly renovated navy experienced a number of early setbacks due to sabotage by Portuguese-born men in the naval crews. But by 1823 the navy had been reformed and the Portuguese members were replaced by native Brazilians, freed slaves, pardoned prisoners as well as more experienced British and American mercenaries. The navy succeeded in clearing the coast of the Portuguese presence and isolating the remaining Portuguese land troops. By the end of 1823, the Brazilian naval forces had pursued the remaining Portuguese ships across the Atlantic nearly as far as the shores of Portugal.

=== Battles in Northern Brazil ===
Resistance by Portuguese troops was concentrated in the regions of Bahia, Pará, and Maranhão,while São Paulo and Minas Gerais remained under the authority of Prince Pedro. The Portuguese sought to keep at least these regions loyal to the regime in Lisbon—hoping, if nothing else, to fragment Brazil and prevent the loss of the entire South American colony—or, in the best-case scenario, to retain control of Bahia and, from there, attempt to reconquer the rest of the Brazilian territories.

== Key battles ==
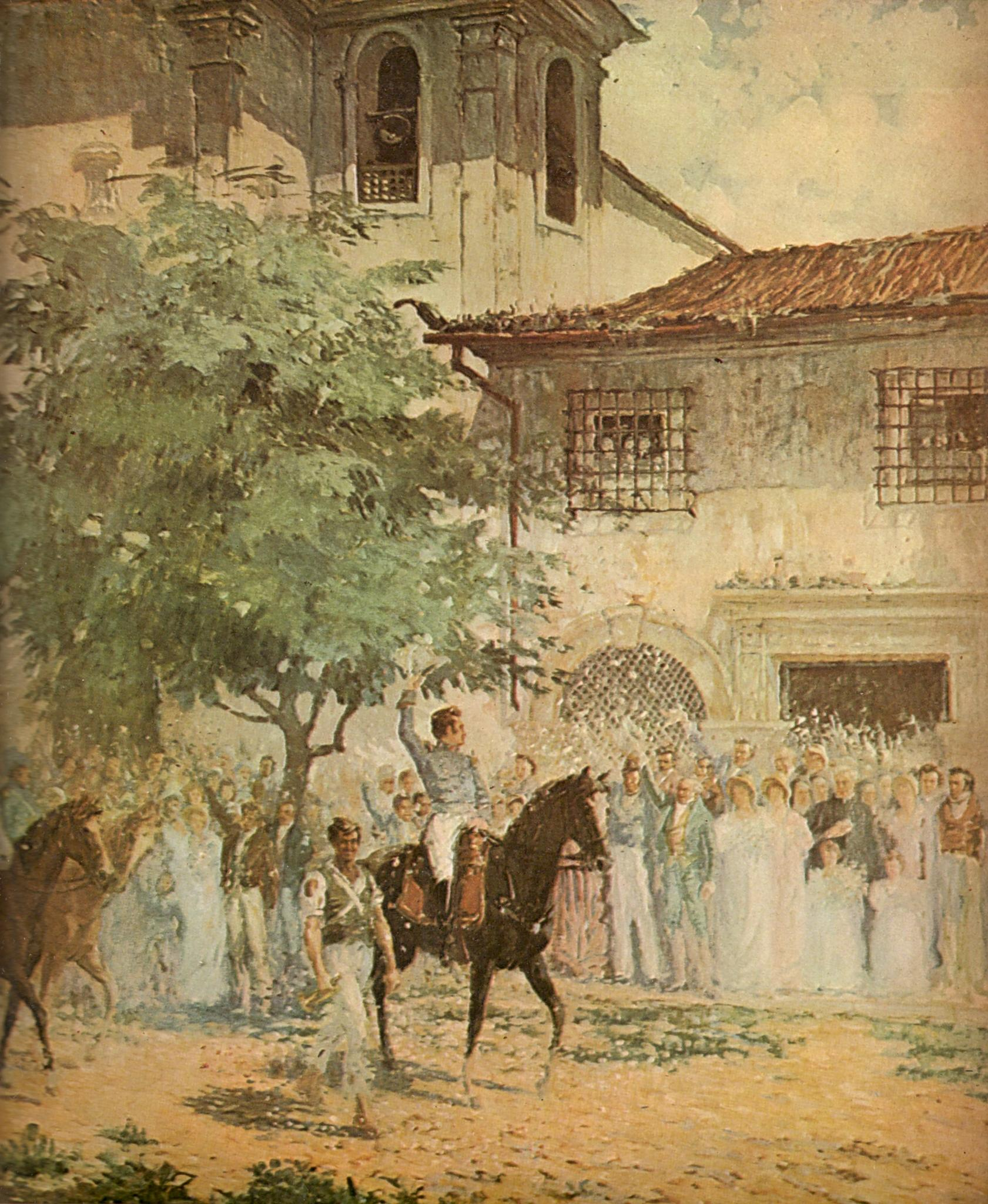
The Imperial Army entering in Salvador after the surrender of the Portuguese forces in 1823

Pernambuco

- Siege of Recife

Piauí and Maranhão

- Battle of Jacaré
- Battle of Jenipapo
- Siege of Caxias

Grão-Pará

- Belém Rebellion
- Muaná Revolt

Bahia

- Invasion of the Convent of Lapa
- Battle of Pirajá
- Battle of Itaparica
- Battle of 4 May 1823
- Siege of Salvador

Cisplatina

- Siege of Montevideo
- Battle of Montevideo

== Proclamation of Independence ==
Seeking to replicate his triumph in Minas Gerais, Pedro rode to São Paulo in August to secure support and began a disastrous affair with Doña Domitila de Castro—his future mistress— which would years later undermine his government. Upon returning from a trip to Santos, Pedro received messages from his wife, Archduchess Maria Leopoldina of Austria, and from Andrada e Silva, informing him that the Portuguese Cortes deemed his government "treacherous" and that the Lisbon court was dispatching more troops to Brazil to forcibly ensure the Brazilians' obedience to King John VI.

== Peace treaty and aftermath ==
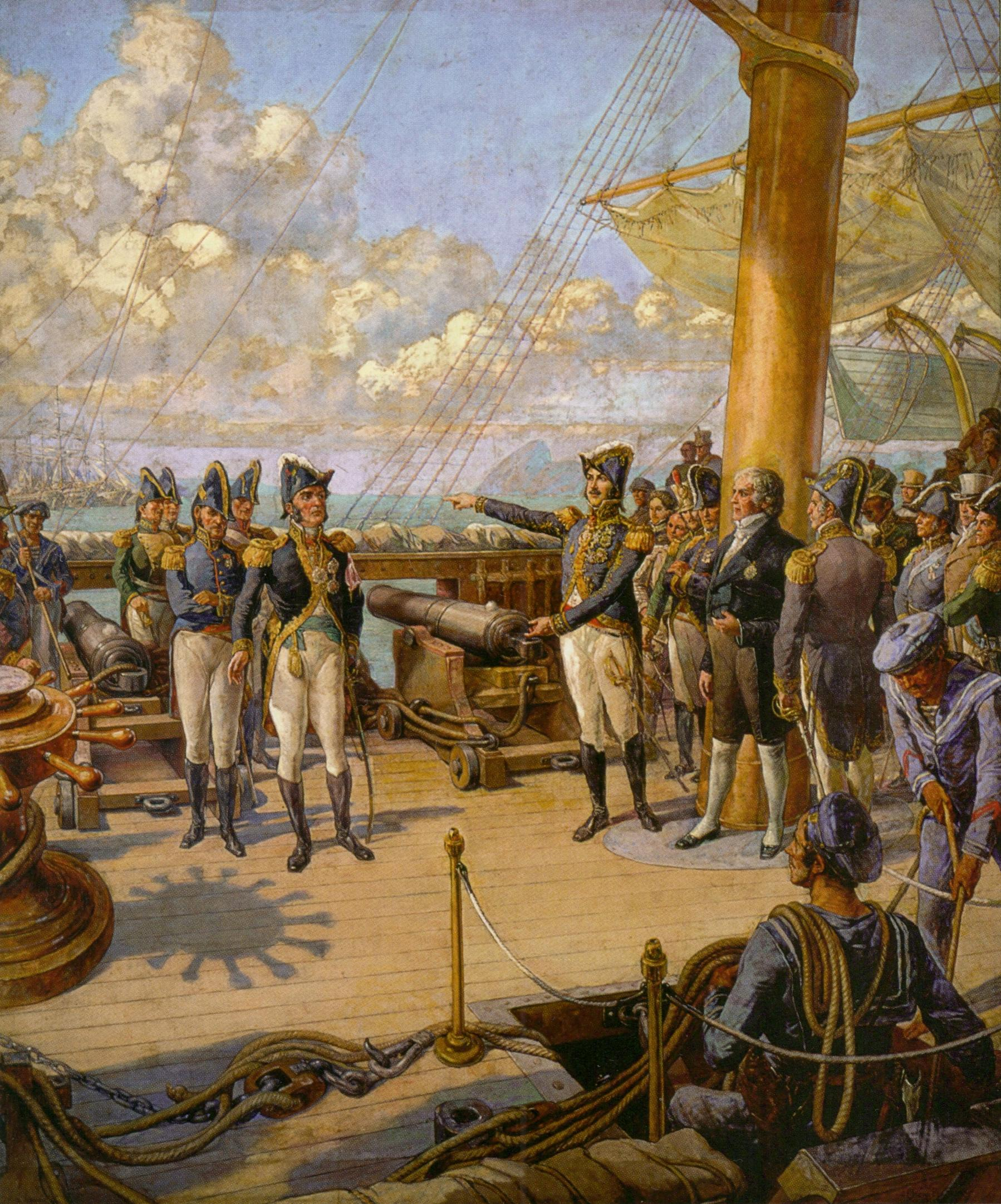
Pedro I (on the right) ordering the Portuguese chief Jorge Avilez to withdraw from Rio de Janeiro towards Portugal, when the attempt of the Portuguese troops to control the city failed

The Portuguese military defeat was not followed by swift recognition of Brazil's independence. From 1822 to 1825 the Portuguese Government engaged in heavy diplomatic efforts to prevent the recognition of Brazil's independence by the European Powers, invoking the principles of the Congress of Vienna and subsequent European alliances.

In 1824, in the wake of the adoption of the Constitution of the Empire of Brazil on 25 March, the United States of America became one of the first nations to recognize the independence of Brazil.

Since the coup d'etát on 3 June 1823 the Portuguese King John VI had already abolished the Portuguese Constitution of 1822 and dissolved the Cortes, thus reversing the Liberal Revolution of 1820. Under British pressure, Portugal eventually agreed to recognize Brazil's independence in 1825, thus allowing the new country to establish diplomatic ties with other European powers.

The first act of recognition was materialized in Letters Patent issued on 13 May 1825, by which the Portuguese King "voluntarily ceded and transferred the sovereignty" over Brazil to his son, the Brazilian Emperor, and thus recognized, as a result of this concession, Brazil as an "Independent Empire, separate from the Kingdoms of Portugal and Algarves".

The second act of recognition was materialized in a Treaty of Peace signed in Rio de Janeiro on 29 August 1825, by means of which Portugal again recognized the independence of Brazil. This Treaty was ratified by the Emperor of Brazil on 30 August 1825, and by the King of Portugal on 15 November 1825, and entered into force in international Law also on 15 November 1825 upon the exchange of the instruments of ratification in Lisbon.

Painting "Independence or Death" showing Don Pedro proclaiming the independence of Brazil on the banks of the Ipiranga River, by Pedro Américo.

The Portuguese, however, only agreed to sign the Independence treaty on condition that Brazil agreed to pay reparations for the properties of the Portuguese State that were seized by the new Brazilian State. Brazil needed to establish normal diplomatic relations with Portugal, because other European monarchies had already made clear that they would only recognize the Empire of Brazil after the establishment of normal relations between Brazil and Portugal. Thus, by a separate convention that was signed on the same occasion as the Treaty on the Recognition of Independence, Brazil agreed to pay Portugal two million pounds in damages. The British, who had mediated the peace negotiations, granted Brazil a loan of the same value, so that Brazil could pay the agreed sum.

In spite of the unpopular clauses, particularly the harsh financial agreement, Brazilian Emperor Pedro I agreed to ratify the treaty negotiated with Portugal as he was keen on resolving the recognition of independence question before the opening of the first legislative session of the Brazilian Parliament (General Assembly) elected under the Constitution adopted in 1824. The first meeting of the new Legislature was set to take place on 3 May 1826, and after a brief delay, that Parliament was indeed opened on 6 May 1826. By that time, the independence question was resolved, as the Independence treaty had been ratified in November 1825 and as the Emperor, still yielding the fullness of legislative authority (that he was to lose upon the first meeting of the Parliament), ordered the execution of the agreement as part of the law of Brazil on 10 April 1826.

With the loss of its only territory in the Americas and a significant portion of its income, Portugal quickly turned its attention to increasing the commercial productivity of its various African possessions (mainly Angola and Mozambique).

== International recognition ==
Some historians have got it wrong in supporting the view of historian Manuel de Oliveira Lima that independence was achieved entirely without violence.weaknesses in securing the logistical supply of weapons and equipment caused both sides to carefully avoid large-scale battles, involving vast numbers of soldiers (unlike what occurred in the rest of South America in large-scale battles such as Carabobo, Boyacá, Maipú, or Ayacucho).

== See also ==
- List of wars involving Brazil
- List of wars of independence
- United Kingdom of Portugal, Brazil and the Algarves
