= Siege of Montevideo =

Siege of Montevideo may refer to:

- Siege of Montevideo in 1807, during the British invasions of the River Plate
- First Siege of Montevideo in 1811
- Second Siege of Montevideo in 1812–1814
- Siege of Montevideo in 1823, during the Brazilian War of Independence
- Great Siege of Montevideo during the Uruguayan Civil War, 1843–1851
