= Battle of Montevideo =

The Battle of Montevideo may refer to:

== Battles ==
- Battle of Montevideo (1807), between the British and Spanish Empires during the Napoleonic Wars
- Battle of Montevideo (1817), or Battle of River Ibicuí, between Luso-Brazilian forces and Uruguayan rebels
- Battle of Montevideo (1823), between Brazilian and Portuguese naval forces during the Brazilian War of Independence
- Battle of Montevideo (1826), between Brazilian and Argentine naval forces during the Cisplatine War
- Battle of Montevideo (1843), in the Uruguayan Civil War

== Sports ==
- 1967 Intercontinental Cup#Play-off, a football match, Celtic vs Racing Club, in Montevideo

== See also ==
- Uruguay
- Montevideo
- Uruguayan Civil War
