= Belém rebellion (1823) =

Belém Rebellion (1823)
- Part of the Brazilian War of Independence
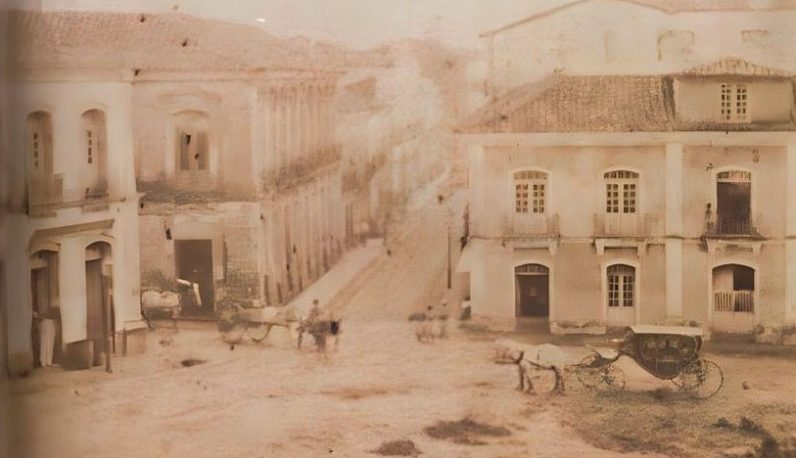
- Largo das Mercês in Belém, where the rebels gathered in 1823 before marching to the artillery barracks, photo taken in 1875
Date	April 13–14, 1823
Location	Belém, Grão-Pará, Brazil
Result	Portuguese victory

Belligerents
United Kingdom of Portugal, Brazil and the Algarves	Belém rebels

Commanders and leaders
José Maria de Moura; João Pereira Villaça; Francisco José Rodrigues Barata; José Antonio Nunes (DOW)	João Baptista Balbi; Domiciano Ernesto Dias Cardoso; José Mariano de Oliveira Bello; Boaventura Ferreira da Silva; Manoel Lourenço de Mattos; Domingos Gonçalves Marreiros; José Narciso da Costa Rocha; Antonio de Loureiro Barreto

Strength
Unknown	Around 100 men

Casualties and losses
1 lieutenant severely wounded	1 killed 1 injured Many arrested 271 deported to Lisbon

The Belém rebellion of 1823 was a rebellion against the Kingdom of Portugal as an attempt to proclaim independence to Grão-Pará and integrate into the Brazilian Empire.

== Background ==
After Prince Regent Dom Pedro proclaimed the independence of Brazil from Portugal on 7 September 1822, several provinces in the northern and northeastern regions of the country were initially reluctant to join the new Brazilian Empire. Among these provinces was Grão-Pará, where they remained loyal to the Portuguese crown, and the region was still controlled by authorities aligned with Portugal.

In early 1823, tensions grew as a movement rose to align the province with the new empire. A group of pro-independence military officers, led by civilians and officers, started planning a rebellion in Belém, the provincial capital. Their goal was to seize key points in the city, declare independence, and pledge allegiance to Dom Pedro. These were led by João Baptista Balbi, Domiciano Ernesto Dias Cardoso, José Mariano de Oliveira Bello, Boaventura Ferreira da Silva, Manoel Lourenço de Mattos, Domingos Gonçalves Marreiros and José Narciso da Costa Rocha. Despite the secrecy surrounding their plans, loyalist authorities were aware of potential rebellion.

The revolt was set for the morning of 14 April. The pro-independence faction worked to overthrow Portuguese control, though they were outnumbered by loyalist forces. The junta took control of the local press, shifting it to the Luso-Paraense to rally public support for independence. The general sentiment was increasingly in favor of independence, but the loyalist faction, and their military officers, worked to prevent it.

== Rebellion ==
On the night of 13 April 1823, 100 revolutionaries met secretly at Balbi's residence in Belém to prepare for the rebellion. The plan was initially secret, but was soon discovered by the governor, who ordered his officers to remain in their barracks. However, the rebels managed to surprise the loyalist forces at dawn, seizing control of the city's artillery park. Antonio de Loureiro Barreto took command of rebel the troops and managed to infiltrate the artillery compound by feigning the rank of a colonel. Caught off guard, the guards allowed the rebels to enter without resistance.

With fireworks set off to signal the occupation, the rebels continued their plan. Boaventura led additional forces, gathering soldiers and civilians who supported independence. As they marched to the Largo das Mercês, they met up with allies from the third regiment, led by José Narciso da Costa Rocha. Together, the group celebrated Dom Pedro and declared their intention to join the Brazilian Empire. They fortified themselves at the artillery park, setting up cannons to defend against any attack.

Lieutenant Colonel José Antonio Nunes attempted to resist the occupation by firing a cannon at the rebels, killing one and wounding another. The rebels retaliated, firing multiple shots that left Nunes severely injured, which led to his death 3 days later.

However, by dawn on 14 April, the tide turned against the rebels. Loyalist forces, led by the governor of arms José Maria de Moura and the colonels João Pereira Villaça and Francisco José Rodrigues Barata, advanced through the city. As they approached, Boaventura ordered his men to hold fire, not wanting to escalate the situation. Barata marched into the Largo das Mercês, proclaiming allegiance to the Portuguese Crown and Dom João VI. As the loyalists regrouped, the revolutionaries were eventually surrounded, and with their leaders captured, they soon surrendered.

== Fate of the rebels ==
After their failture, Portuguese authorities arrested many of the rebels, holding them in the Fortress of Barra in Belém. Others, particularly civilian supporters, were confined in the public jail. While a few managed to escape, the majority faced imprisonment and, later, deportation.

Under pressure from the president of the provincial governing council, Romualdo Antônio de Seixas, authorities ultimately decided against capital punishment for the rebels, fearing that severe reprisals might provoke other unrest. Instead, 271 of the rebels were deported to Lisbon, where many suffered from disease and poor conditions in the São Julião prison. Of those deported, only 171 survived the ordeal and eventually returned to Brazil.

Some, including both military and civilian personnel, managed to escape, hiding in the town of Muaná, in the island of Marajó.

== Muaná revolt ==
Tensions in Grão-Pará continued. On May 28, the refugees in Muaná joined forces with the local landowner José Pedro de Azevêdo, who, leading a group of 200 men, proclaimed Brazil's independence in the name of Dom Pedro, they then captured the village.

In response to this movement, Major Francisco José Ribeiro was sent to Muaná. After a four-hour fight, he managed to suppress the revolt and arrest many of its participants, including Pedro de Azevêdo. The prisoners were taken to the Public Jail, who displayed palmatorias (wooden paddles) and whips in the windows as symbols of repression.

Grão-Pará later incorporated into the Brazilian Empire in October 1823.

== Bibliography ==
- Raiol, Domingos Antônio (1865). Motins politicos; ou, Historia dos principaes acontecimentos politicos da provincia do Pará desde o anno de 1821 até 1835 (in Portuguese). Lucas Pordeus Leon.
- Agência, Rádio (September 2, 2022). "Guerras da Independência: Conflitos armados pela liberdade no Pará" (in Portuguese). Lucas Pordeus Leon.
- Muaná, IBGE (2023). "Muaná" (in Portuguese).
