= Battle of Jacaré (1823) =

- Part of Brazilian War of Independence
- Location of Piracuruca, Piauí
Date	March 11, 1823
Location	Lagoa do Jacaré, Piracuruca, Piauí, Brazil
Result	Portuguese victory

Belligerents
United Kingdom of Portugal, Brazil and the Algarves	Empire of Brazil; Piauí rebels; Ceará rebels

Commanders and leaders
Cunha Fidié	Unknown

Strength
80 cavalrymen	40–50 rebels

Casualties and losses
1 captured and killed	Several killed

The Battle of Jacaré (1823) was a minor engagement during the Brazilian War of Independence, between Portuguese loyalist cavalry under Cunha Fidié and pro–independence rebels from Piauí and Ceará.

== Background ==
In January 1823, towns across the province of Piauí including Piracuruca, Oeiras, and Campo Maior, declared independence from Portuguese rule. The Portuguese military, led by Major João José da Cunha Fidié, was tasked with suppressing these separatist movements.

After abandoning Parnaíba due to increasing resistance, Fidié launched a campaign to retake Oeiras, the provincial capital. On February 28, 1823, during his march from Parnaíba, Fidié's forces encountered a small contingent of 40-50 rebels positioned near the Lagoa do Jacaré. The rebels aimed to delay Fidié's advance and prevent his forces from regrouping and attacking the more significant resistance movements in Oeiras and Campo Maior.

== Battle ==
The rebels took up defensive positions along the shores of Jacaré. Their goal was to delay Fidié's advances, hoping to block their superior forces, however, the rebels were quickly overwhelmed. Fidié's troops inflicted heavy losses on the rebel contingent, scattering the defenders.

== Aftermath ==
After the victory, Fidié's troops continued their march toward Piracuruca and Campo Maior without significant delay. And 2 days later, Fidié would once again fight at the banks of the Jenipapo River.
