= Invasion of the Convent of Lapa =

- Part of the Brazilian War of Independence
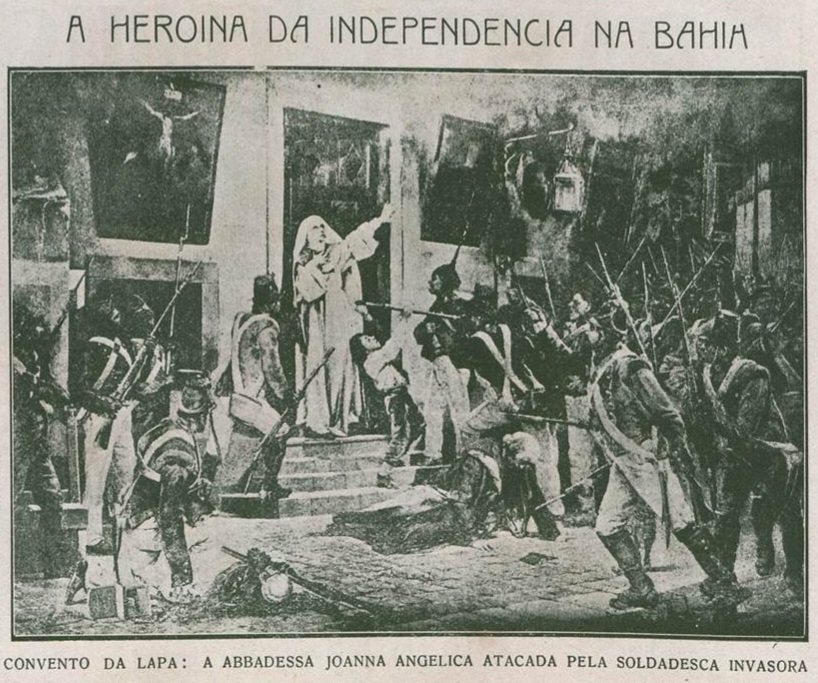
- Joana Angélica ou a Mártir da Independência by Firmino Monteiro, c. 1885–1886 (lost painting)
- Location: Convent of Lapa, Salvador, Bahia, Brazil
- Date: 19 February 1822
- Deaths: 2
- Perpetrator: Royal Portuguese Army

The invasion of the Convent of Lapa or the martyrdom of Joana Angélica was a violent episode during the Brazilian War of Independence, where Portuguese troops attacked the Convent of Lapa in Salvador, Bahia. The assault resulted in the deaths of Abbess Joana Angélica and Father Daniel da Silva Lisboa (brother of the future Viscount of Cairu).

== Background ==
On 18 February, a group of independence supporters, including soldiers, officers, and civilians, occupied the Fort of São Pedro in Salvador. In response, Madeira de Melo ordered the fort to be bombarded, forcing the rebels to abandon their position and retreat into the countryside.

== Invasion ==
On 19 February, Portuguese soldiers and sailors, many of them drunk, targeted the Convent of Lapa. The convent, a place of sanctuary for nuns, became the focus of their aggression as the invaders sought to break its isolation. Standing at the entrance was Joana Angélica, she confronted the attackers and refused to allow them to enter. Despite her efforts, the soldiers forced their way in. Joana Angélica was fatally wounded by bayonet strikes as she tried to protect the nuns, alongside Father Daniel da Silva Lisboa, who was beaten to death.
