= Battle of Itaparica =

- Part of the Brazilian War of Independence
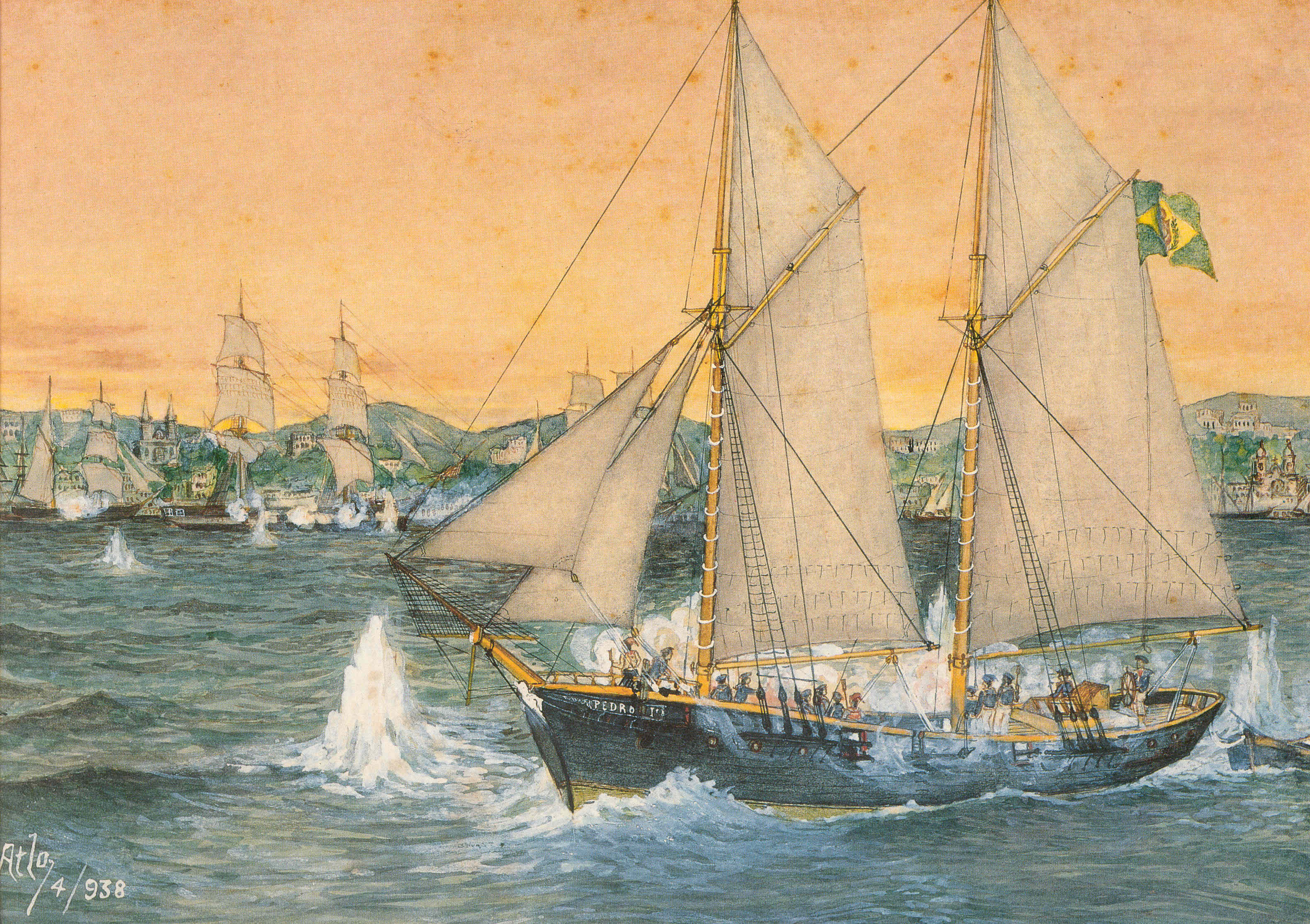
- "The Itaparica Flotilla" in 1823 by Trajano Augusto de Carvalho, 1938
Date	7–9 January 1823
Location	Itaparica Island, Bahia, Brazil 12°59′00″S 38°40′00″W
Result	Brazilian victory

Belligerents
Empire of Brazil	Kingdom of Portugal

Commanders and leaders
Antônio de Sousa Lima; João das Botas	Joaquim José da Cunha

Strength
3,257 soldiers Ships: 2 gunboats	1,200 soldiers Ships: 2 brigs 1 schooner 1 barque 35 gunboats/small vessels

Casualties and losses
Unknown	Unknown

The Battle of Itaparica was fought in the then province of Bahia from January 7 to 9, 1823, between the Brazilian Army and Armada and the Portuguese Army and Navy during the Brazilian War of Independence.

Despite the fact that the independence of Brazil had been proclaimed by Prince Regent Pedro on 7 September 1822, the armed struggle continued in Bahia, with the confrontation of Portuguese resistance. The fights lasted until 2 July 1823, when the Bahian victory was finally proclaimed. In January 1823, Itaparica Island was the scene of the Battle of Itaparica, a Brazilian triumph that was fundamental to victory in the war.

Commanded by Antônio de Sousa Lima, the soldiers of the Itaparica Battalion defended the island from the desperate attack of the Portuguese, using a defensive system that began at the São Lourenço Fort, and continued with trenches mounted in strategic places, manned by soldiers. and small cannon pieces, such as Largo da Quitanda, Fonte da Bica, and Praia da Convento, as well as the beaches of Amoreiras, Mocambo, Manguinhos, and Porto dos Santos, among others.

On the Portuguese side, João Félix Pereira de Campos was the commander of the Portuguese fleet in Bahia, 42 vessels of different sizes were involved in this attack, which resulted in a shameful defeat for Portuguese soldiers and sailors. According to Pereira de Campos' letters, which they attributed to the fact that there was a garrison made up of an unexpected number of people and the "way of defending" against the forces of the island of Itaparica.
