= Liberal Revolution of 1820 =

Portuguese revolution establishing a constitutional monarchy

- Part of the Revolutions of 1820
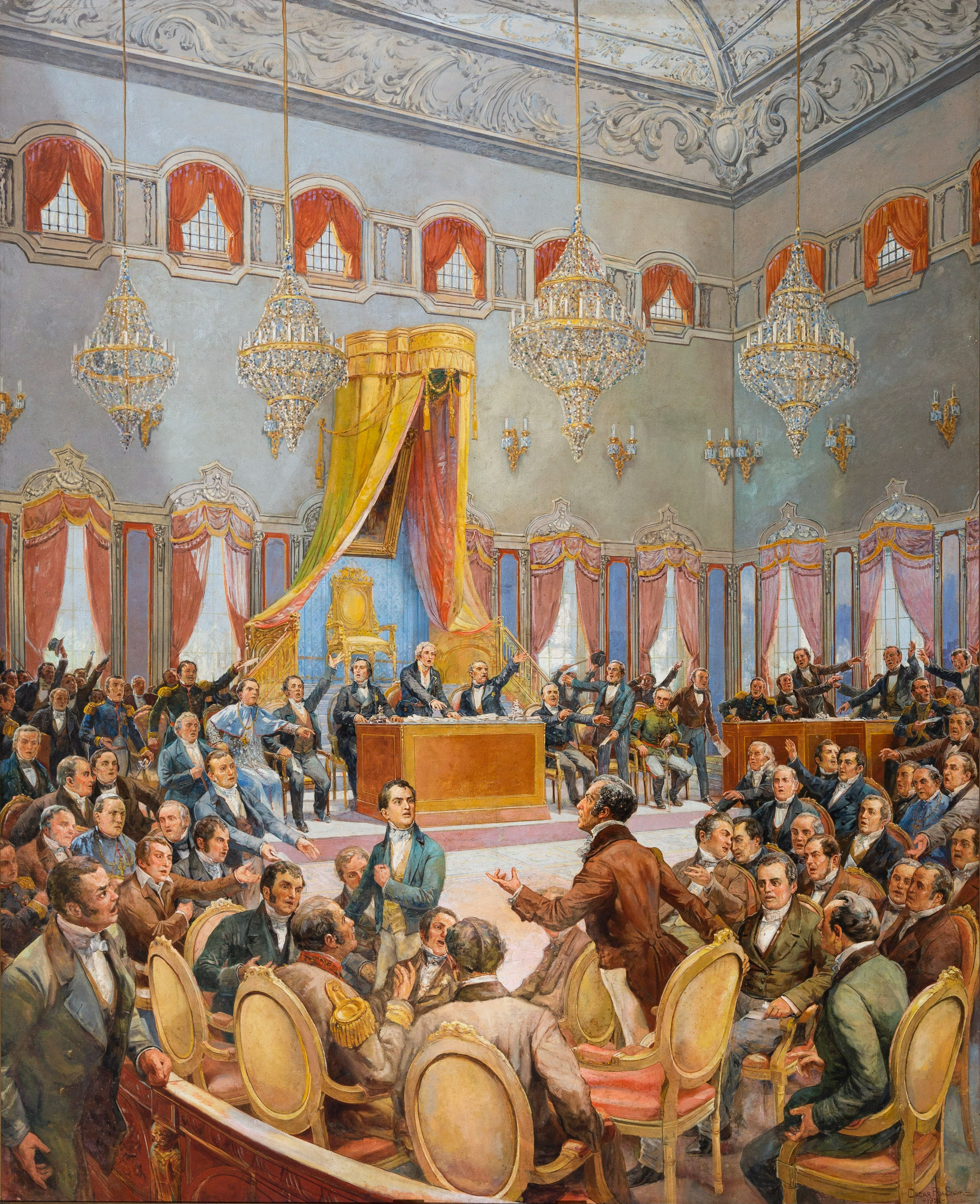
- The General and Extraordinary Cortes of the Portuguese Nation that approved the first Portuguese Constitution
- Date: 24 August 1820
- Location: Portugal
- Participants: Portuguese society
- Outcome: Return of the Portuguese court from Brazil; End of absolutism and establishment of a constitutional monarchy

The Liberal Revolution of 1820 (Portuguese: Revolução Liberal) was a Portuguese political revolution that erupted in 1820. It began with a military insurrection in the city of Porto, in northern Portugal, that quickly and peacefully spread to the rest of the country. The Revolution resulted in the return in 1821 of the Portuguese court to Portugal from Brazil, where it had fled during the Peninsular War, and initiated a constitutional period in which the 1822 Constitution was ratified and implemented. The movement's liberal ideas had an important influence on Portuguese society and political organization in the nineteenth century.

== Historical background ==
From 1807 to 1811 French forces invaded Portugal thrice. As a result, the Portuguese royal family was transferred to the Portuguese colony of Brazil, where it remained until 1821. From Brazil, the Portuguese King John VI ruled his transcontinental empire for thirteen years.

Following the defeat of the French forces in 1814, Portugal experienced a prolonged period of political turmoil, in which many sought greater self-rule for the Portuguese people. Eventually, this unrest put an end to the King's long stay in Brazil, when his return to Portugal was demanded by the revolutionaries.

During and after the Peninsular War, the Portuguese people found themselves being ruled from Brazil and being subject to extensive control by Britain. Much of the Portuguese Army's officer corps were angered that the army was subject to British control and commanded by an Englishman, William Beresford. The 1808 Decree of the Opening of Ports to Friendly Nations opened Brazilian markets to foreign trade, while the 1810 Strangford Treaty guaranteed favored status to British goods in Portugal and resulted in Portuguese goods, in particular those produced in Lisbon and Porto, being unable to compete with them and setting off an economic crisis which deeply affected Portugal's bourgeoisie. Porto, with a prosperous and influential bourgeoisie who had maintained a rich liberal tradition, was the place where the Liberal Revolution began.

After Napoleon's final defeat in 1815, a clandestine Supreme Regenerative Council of Portugal and the Algarve was formed in Lisbon by Portuguese army officers and freemasons, headed by General Gomes Freire de Andrade—Grand Master of the Grand Orient of Portugal and former general under Napoleon until his defeat in 1814—with the objective to end British control over Portugal, aiming to promote "the salvation and independence" of the pátria. In its brief existence the movement attempted to introduce liberalism in Portugal, although it ultimately failed to do so. In 1817 three masons, João de Sá Pereira Soares, Morais Sarmento and José Andrade Corvo, denounced the movement to the authorities, who arrested many suspects, including Freire de Andrade, who was charged with conspiracy against John VI, represented in continental Portugal by a regency, then overseen by a military government led by Beresford.

In October 1817, the Regency found the twelve of the accused guilty of treason against the nation and sentenced them to death by hanging. Beresford intended to suspend the sentence until it was confirmed by John VI, but the Regency, judging that such a move was a slight to its authority, ordered their immediate execution, which took place on 18 October at Campo do Santana (today, Campo dos Mártires da Pátria, "Field of the Martyrs of the Fatherland"). Freire de Andrade was executed on the same day at the Fort of São Julião da Barra. The executions sparked protests against Beresford and the Regency and intensified anti-British sentiments in Portugal.

A couple of years after the executions, Beresford left for Brazil to ask the King for more resources and powers to suppress the lingering presence of what he called "Jacobinism," which were granted to him. In his absence, the Revolution of Porto broke out in 1820, and upon his arrival from Brazil, he was forbidden to disembark in Lisbon.

== Revolution ==
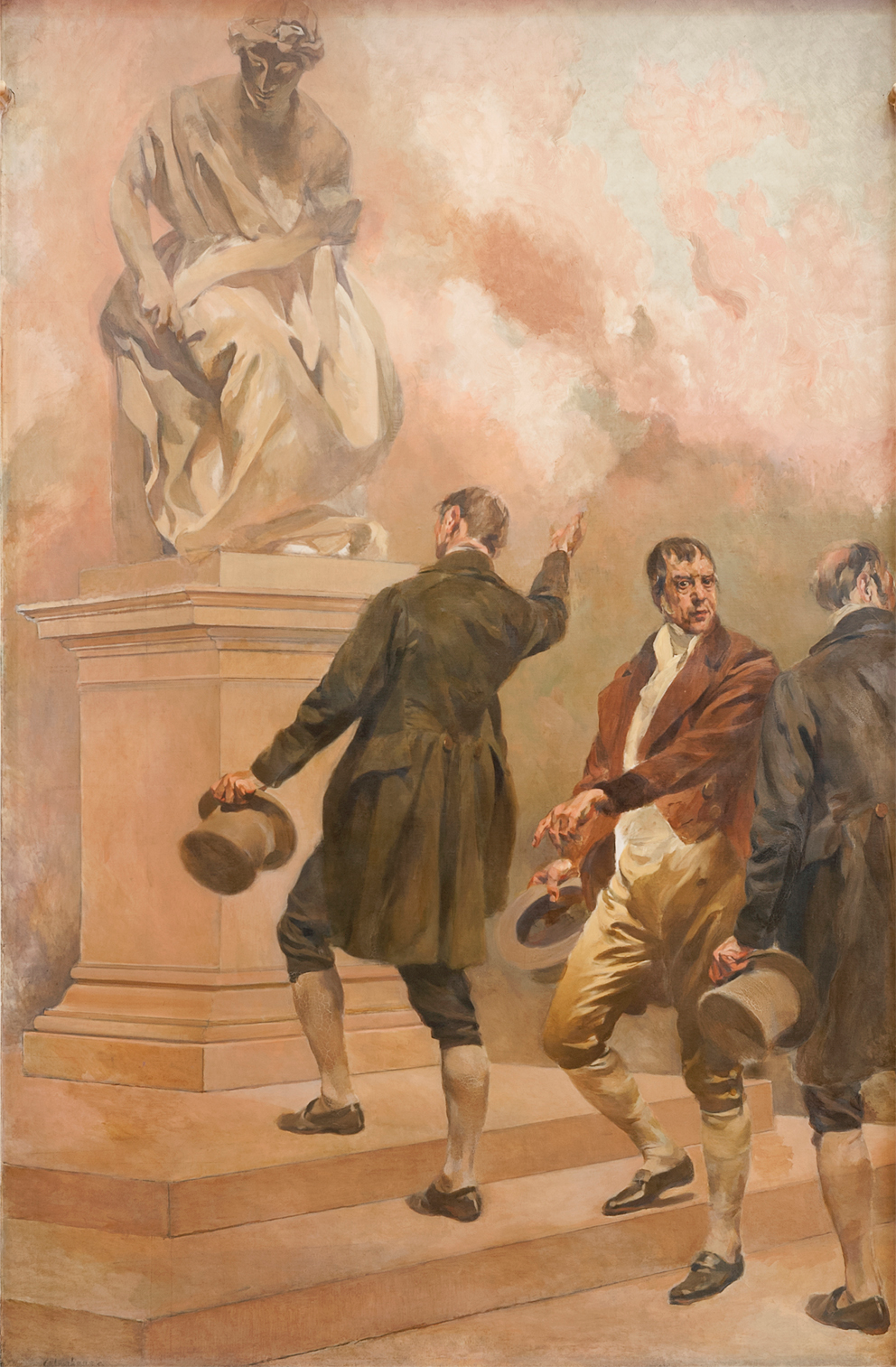
Allegory of the parliamentarians of 1822: Manuel Fernandes Tomás, Manuel Borges Carneiro, and Joaquim António de Aguiar (Columbano Bordalo Pinheiro, 1926)

Influenced by the concurrent Trienio Liberal revolution in Spain of 1 January 1820, a liberal revolution started in Porto, quickly spreading without resistance to several other Portuguese cities and towns, culminating with the revolt of Lisbon. The revolutionaries demanded the immediate return of the royal court to continental Portugal in order to "restore the metropolitan dignity." In fact, the liberal revolution of 1820 not only forced the return of the King but also demanded a constitutional monarchy to be set up in Portugal. The revolutionaries also sought to restore Portuguese exclusivity in the trade with Brazil, reverting Brazil to the status of a colony, officially to be reduced to a "Principality of Brazil," instead of the Kingdom of Brazil, which it had been for the past five years. The Brazilian kingdom had legally been an equal, constituent part of the United Kingdom of Portugal, Brazil and the Algarves. The revolutionaries organized the election of a constitutional assembly which debated the nature of the future government. The elections resulted in deputies who were primarily from the professions (lawyers, professors) and not from the merchants who had spearheaded the revolution. Professionals now took the lead in the revolution. The constitution that was approved in 1822 was closely modeled on the Spanish Constitution of 1812.

== Aftermath ==
After John VI returned to Portugal in 1821, his heir-apparent, Pedro, became regent of the Kingdom of Brazil. Following a series of political events and disputes, Brazil declared its independence from Portugal on 7 September 1822. On 12 October 1822, Pedro was acclaimed as the first Emperor of Brazil. He was crowned on 1 December 1822. Portugal recognized Brazil's sovereignty in 1825.

In 1823, the first revolt against the constitutional order was organized by Prince Miguel and Brigadier João Carlos Saldanha, which managed to close the parliament and to convince King John VI to recall Beresford as an advisor. In 1826 John VI died with no clear heir, further destabilizing the nation. Upon seizing the throne, Miguel abolished the constitutional government, triggering six years of civil wars, which pitted him against his brother, Pedro, who abdicated as emperor of Brazil to enforce the succession rights of his daughter Maria II and headed the liberal faction.

== See also ==
- History of Portugal (1777–1834)
- Liberalism in Portugal
- Remexido

== Bibliography ==
- Birmingham, David (2003). A Concise History of Portugal. Cambridge Concise Histories (2nd ed.). Cambridge University Press. ISBN 0-521-53686-3.
- Nowell, Charles E. (1952). A History of Portugal. New York: D. Van Nostrand Company.
