= Siege of Caxias =

- Part of the Brazilian War of Independence
Date	May 23 to July 31, 1823
Location	Caxias, Maranhão, Brazil
Result	Brazilian victory

Belligerents
Empire of Brazil	Kingdom of Portugal

Commanders and leaders
José Pereira Figueiras	João José da Cunha Fidié

Strength
8,000	At the beginning: ~1,600; At the end: 700

Casualties and losses
Unknown	Unknown

The siege of Caxias was a siege during the Brazilian War of Independence in which the Brazilian Army under the command of José Pereira Filgueiras attempted to capture the city of Caxias in Maranhão, which was defended by the Portuguese Army of João José da Cunha Fidié. The siege lasted from 23 May 1823 until 31 July 1823, when the Portuguese surrendered to the Brazilian forces after the combats that occurred between 17 July and 19 July that severely reduced its numbers. The event marked the beginning of the Portuguese forces' collapse in Maranhão.

== Bibliography ==
- Varnhagen, Francisco Adolfo de (1972). História da Independência do Brasil (in Portuguese). Brasília: Instituto Nacional do Livro.
- Diégues, Fernando (2004). A Revolução Brasílica (in Portuguese). Rio de Janeiro: Editora Objetiva. ISBN 978-85-7302-613-9.
