= Siege of Montevideo (1823) =

- Part of the Brazilian War of Independence
Date	20 January 1823 – 8 March 1824
Location	Montevideo in Cisplatina, Brazil
Result	Brazilian victory

Belligerents
Empire of Brazil	Kingdom of Portugal

Commanders and leaders
Carlos F. Lecor	Sousa Macedo

Strength
3,000 Ships: 1 corvette 3 brigs 2 schooners	4,000 Ships: 2 corvettes 1 brig 1 schooner

Casualties and losses
Unknown	Unknown

The siege of Montevideo occurred during the Brazilian War of Independence, during which the Brazilian Army under Carlos Frederico Lecor attempted to capture the city of Montevideo in Cisplatina (now Uruguay) from the Portuguese Army of Álvaro da Costa de Sousa de Macedo. The siege lasted from 20 January 1823 until 8 March 1824 when the Portuguese surrendered to the Brazilian forces. The naval defeat in the Battle of Montevideo (1823) also contributed to hasten the surrender of the Portuguese troops. The event marked the end of the resistance against independence of Brazil in its territory.

== See also ==
- Battle of Montevideo (disambiguation)
- Battle of Montevideo (1823) (naval battle)
- Great Siege of Montevideo (1843-1851)
