= Battle of Montevideo (1823) =

Battle between the Brazilian Empire and Portugal; Brazilian victory

- Part of the Brazilian War of Independence
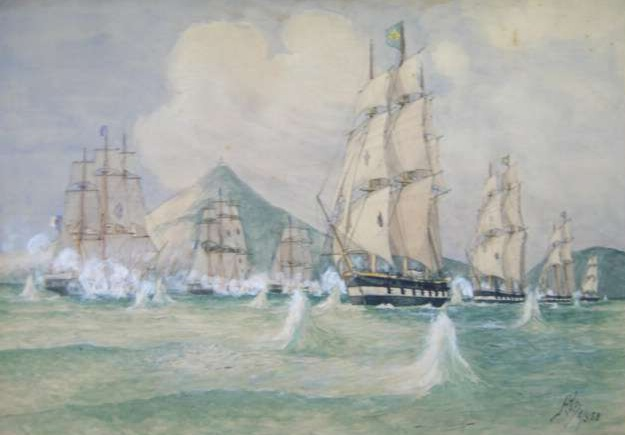
- O Combate Naval de Montevidéu, by Trajano Augusto de Carvalho, 1938.
Date	21 October 1823
Location	Río de la Plata, off of Montevideo, Uruguay
Result	Inconclusive

Belligerents
Empire of Brazil	Kingdom of Portugal

Commanders and leaders
Pedro Antônio Nunes	José Maria de Sousa tavares

Strength
1 Corvette; 3 Brigs; 3 Schooners	2 Corvettes; 1 Brig; 1 Schooner

The naval Battle of Montevideo (Portuguese: Batalha Naval de Montevidéu) of 21 October 1823 formed a part of the Siege of Montevideo, as Brazilian forces sought to capture the last Portuguese redoubt in the Cisplatina during the Brazilian War of Independence.

The battle was one of the few conventional naval battles between the two powers during the war. The Portuguese forces, a captured schooner and three armed transports, had endured the Brazilian blockade of the port but only sought to break it on 21 October.

Despite heavy fighting neither side lost a ship, and the Portuguese withdrew to the port, with the conflict ending a month later with the surrender of Montevideo.

== Order of Battle ==
=== Brazilian Navy (Captain of Sea and War Pedro Antônio Nunes) ===
- Corvette Liberal (24) Flagship, Captain Lieutenant Antônio Salema Freire Garção
- Brig Cacique (18) Captain Lieutenant Antônio Joaquim do Couto
- Brig Guarani (16) First Lieutenant James Nicoll
- Brig Real Pedro (14) Second Lieutenant Francisco da Silva Lobão
- Schooner Leopoldina (12) First Lieutenant Francisco Bibiano de Castro
- Schooner Seis de Fevereiro (1) First Lieutenant Francisco de Paula Osório
- Schooner Cossaca (1) Second Lieutenant Jacinto Alves Branco Muniz Barreto

=== Portuguese Navy (Captain Lieutenant José Maria de Sousa Tavares) ===
- Corvette Conde dos Arcos (26) Flagship, Sousa Tavares accumulated the role of commander of the naval force at the same time.
- Corvette Restauradora (16) Commander João Caetano de Bulhões Leotti
- Brig Líguri (16) Commander Procópio Lourenço de Andrade
- Schooner Maria Tereza (14) Commander Pedro Antônio da Silva
