= Treaty of Rio de Janeiro (1825) =

Treaty between Portugal and Brazil

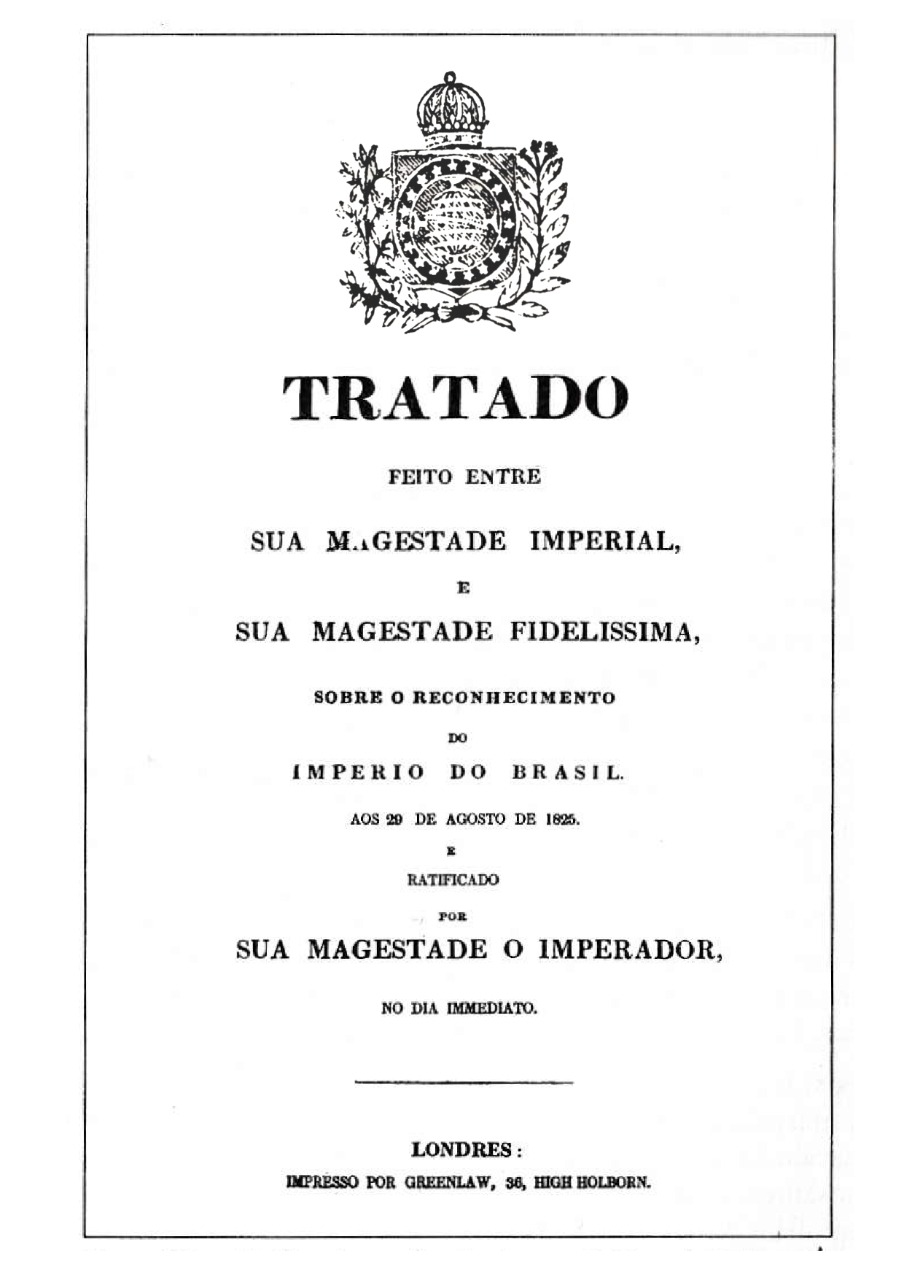
- Cover of an edition printed in London
- Signed: 29 August 1825
- Location: Rio de Janeiro, Empire of Brazil
- Signatories: Empire of Brazil; Kingdom of Portugal
- Ratifiers: Emperor Pedro I of Brazil; King John VI of Portugal
- Language: Portuguese

The Treaty of Rio de Janeiro is the treaty between the Kingdom of Portugal and the Empire of Brazil, signed August 29, 1825, which recognized Brazil as an independent nation, formally ending the Brazilian War of Independence.

The treaty was ratified by the Emperor of Brazil on August 24, 1825, and by the King of Portugal on November 15, 1825, and on that same date the two instruments of ratification were exchanged between Brazilian and Portuguese diplomats in Lisbon.

The Treaty entered into force on November 15, 1825, upon the exchange of the ratification documents. It was proclaimed in Portugal on that same date, and was proclaimed in Brazil on April 10, 1826.

== British mediation ==
The treaty was mediated by the British government, which supported Brazilian independence and informally recognized the independence of Brazil before the signing of treaty. However, the British government wished to receive promises that Brazil would abolish its slave trade with Africa. Afterwards, the newly independent Brazilian government signed the British-Brazilian Treaty of 1826, promised to abolish its slave trade within four years, and negotiated various other commercial factors.

== Content ==
The treaty consists of eleven articles, which establish respectively:

- ART. I – His Most Faithful Majesty recognizes Brazil in the category of independent Empire and separated from the Kingdoms of Portugal and the Algarves; And to his most beloved and dear son Pedro by Emperor, yielding and transferring from his free will the sovereignty of the said Empire to his son and to his legitimate successors. His Most Faithful Majesty only takes and reserves for himself the same title.
- ART. II – His Imperial Majesty, in recognition of the respect and love of his august father, the Lord John VI, consented to His Most Faithful Majesty to take to his person the title of Emperor.
- ART. III – His Imperial Majesty promises not to accept the proposal of any Portuguese Colonies to join the Empire of Brazil.
- ART. IV – There will now be peace and alliance and the most perfect friendship between the Kingdoms of Portugal and the Algarves and the Empire of Brazil with complete forgetfulness of the past disputes between the respective peoples. His Imperial Majesty pledges to pay the sum of two million pounds sterling, or 80 tons of gold, as compensation, to the Kingdoms of Portugal and the Algarves.
- ART. V – The subjects of both Portuguese and Brazilian Nations shall be considered and treated in their respective States as those of the most favored and friendly nation, and their rights and properties religiously guarded and protected; It being understood that the present owners of real property shall be held in the peaceful possession of the same property.
- ART. VI – All ownership of real estate, or furniture and stocks, seized or confiscated, belonging to the subjects of both the sovereigns of Portugal and Brazil shall then be refunded, as well as their past income, minus the expenses of the administration, their indemnified owners reciprocally in the manner set forth in Article VIII.
- ART. VII – All vessels and cargoes apprehended, belonging to the subjects of both sovereigns, shall be similarly restituted or their owners compensated.
- ART. VIII – A commission appointed by both Governments, composed of Portuguese and Brazilian nationals of equal numbers, and established by their respective Governments, shall be charged with examining the subject matter of Articles VI and VII; It being understood that complaints shall be made within one year after the commission has been formed and that in the event of a tie in the votes, the matter shall be decided by the representative of the sovereign mediator. Both Governments shall indicate the funds by which the first claims settled shall be paid.
- ART. IX – All public complaints from Government to Government will be reciprocally received and decided, or with the restitution of the objects claimed, or with compensation of their fair value. In order to adjust these claims both High Contracting Parties agree to make a direct and special Convention.
- ART. X – Trade relations between both Portuguese and Brazilian Nations will be restored from the outset, with all commodities repaying 15 percent of consumer rights provisionally; With the duties of re-exporting and re-exporting the same as that practiced before the separation.
- ART. XI – The reciprocal exchange of ratifications of this Treaty shall take place in the city of Lisbon within five months or shorter, if possible, from the date of signature of this Treaty. In witness whereof, we, the undersigned, the plenipotentiaries of His Most Faithful Majesty and His Imperial Majesty, by virtue of our respective full powers, have signed this Treaty with our fists, and have set the seal of our arms upon them. Done in the city of Rio de Janeiro, on the 29th day of August, 1825.

== See also ==
- Brazilian Declaration of Independence
- Brazilian imperial family
- Empire of Brazil
