= Independence of Bahia =

Set of military campaigns for the Independence of Brazil

- Part of the Brazilian War of Independence
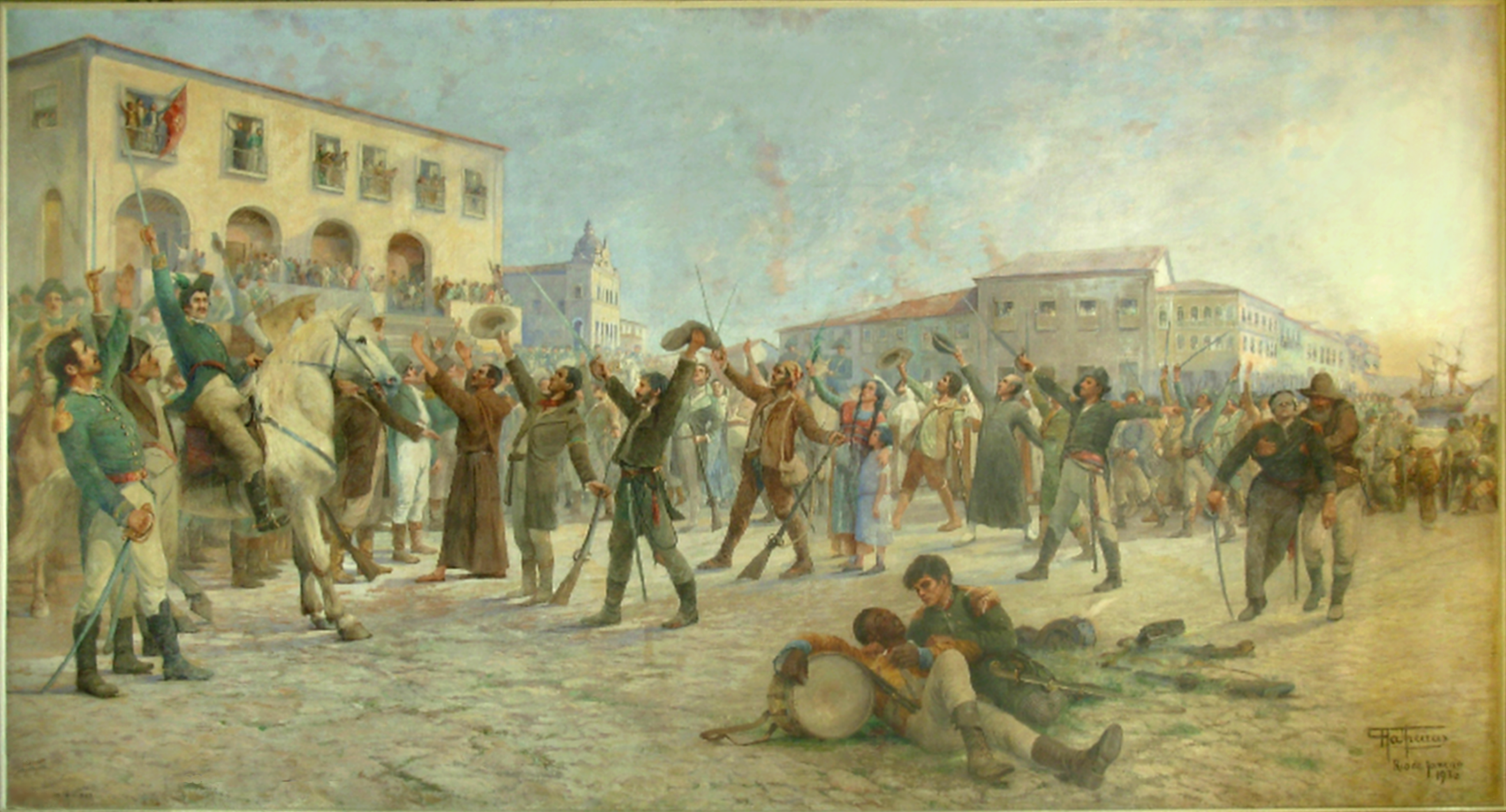
- The First Step towards the Independence of Bahia, by Antônio Parreiras
Date	19 February 1822 – 2 July 1823 (1 year, 4 months, 1 week and 6 days)
Location	Bahia, Brazil
Result	Brazilian victory

Belligerents
Independentists Empire of Brazil (from 7 September 1822)	Loyalists: Portuguese Empire

Commanders and leaders
Pierre Labatut; Viscount of Pirajá; José de Barros Falcão; Felisberto G. Caldeira; Rodrigo A. Brandão; José de Lima e Silva; Antero Ferreira de Brito; Antônio de Souza Lima; Manuel de Lima e Silva; João das Botas; Thomas Cochrane	Madeira de Melo; João Félix Pereira de Campos

The Independence of Bahia (Brazilian Portuguese: Independência da Bahia), (Note: The term Independence of Bahia refers to the series of events that consolidated the Independence of Brazil in the current state of Bahia. Historically, this title was attributed to various artistic and literary works, festivals and monuments in memory of such events, making this form of attribution common, although they did not, in fact, culminate in the Independence of the state of Bahia. Still, some authors opt for the term Independence in Bahia.) also called the Independence of Brazil in Bahia (Brazilian Portuguese: Independência do Brasil na Bahia), was the movement that, beginning on 19 February 1822 and concluding on 2 July 1823, secured the integration of Bahia as a province in the Empire of Brazil, consolidating the country's independence.

Salvador, the capital of the Province of Bahia and one of the most important cities of the Kingdom of Brazil, then part of the United Kingdom of Portugal, Brazil, and the Algarves, joined the Liberal Revolution of Porto in 1820. With the convening of the Constituent Cortes in Lisbon in January 1821, the province sent its representatives, including Miguel Calmon du Pin e Almeida, to defend local interests. The city split into factions: the liberals - uniting both Portuguese and Brazilians - sought to preserve the status quo achieved when the Portuguese royal court relocated to Brazil and elevated it to the rank of a kingdom, while the Portuguese wished to return to the prior colonial condition. As tensions rose, sides hardened: on one end, the Portuguese sought to keep the province as a colony; on the other, Brazilians - liberals, conservatives, monarchists, and even republicans - joined forces in a common struggle. The conflict, ongoing for nearly a year, only unified after 14 June 1822, when the Chamber of Santo Amaro da Purificação proclaimed national unity and recognized the authority of prince Pedro of Braganza.

Although preceded by the Beberibe Convention and reactions to the Dia do Fico, the struggle for independence in Bahia began before Brazil's official separation from Portugal on 7 September 1822, only coming to fruition almost a year after it. Unlike the relatively peaceful proclamation at the Ipiranga stream, the struggle in Bahia against Portugal came at the cost of bloody land and naval battles. On 8 November 1822, the Battle of Pirajá took place. French General Pierre Labatut, hired by Pedro I to fight for Brazilian independence, reinforced the troops besieging Bahia's capital with Major (later Colonel) José de Barros Falcão de Lacerda's brigade, consisting of 1,300 soldiers from Pernambuco, Bahia, and Rio de Janeiro. They repelled three Portuguese assaults, causing 80 deaths and leaving another 80 wounded. In April 1823, the imperial fleet under British Admiral Thomas Cochrane arrived in Salvador and blockaded the port. Deprived of food supplies and unable to receive reinforcements, the Portuguese evacuated during the night of 1–2 July, carrying away whatever riches they could. On 2 July 1823, the Liberation Army triumphantly entered the city, already abandoned by the Portuguese. Over the course of the movement, which lasted one year and four months, around 150 Brazilians were killed in combat. That day became a public holiday in Bahia and is celebrated annually with civic parades retracing the route taken by General Labatut in 1823 through Salvador, in what is known as the Bahia Independence Festival.

== Context ==
=== Background ===
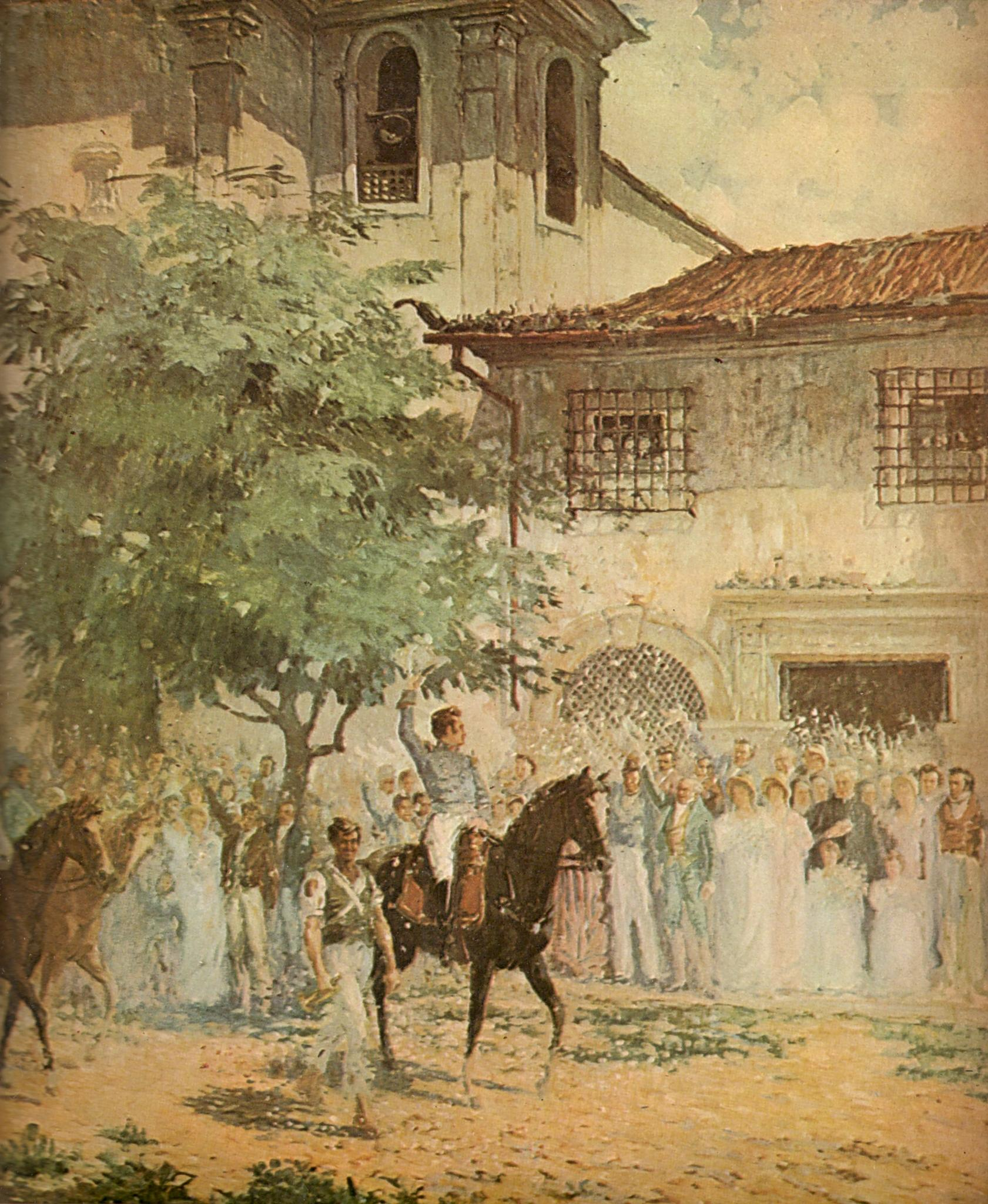
Entrada do Exército Libertador, painting by Presciliano Silva, from 1930. It depicts the triumphant entry of Commander Lima e Silva into Salvador, together with the bugler Lopes, in front of the Convent of Solitude, on July 2, 1823. Collection of the Salvador City Council.

Since the Bahian Conspiracy (1798), it can be said that in Bahia, even more than in Minas Gerais during the Inconfidência Mineira (1789), the feeling of independence from Portugal was deeply rooted in the population. While in Minas the conspiratorial movement took place among the wealthiest families, in Bahia, humble people actively participated, for example by posting posters on the streets urging everyone's support.

The Liberal Revolution of Porto (1820) had enormous repercussions in Bahia, where the number of Portuguese was large. As a result, in February 1821 a constitutionalist conspiracy broke out in Salvador. Cipriano Barata, José Pedro de Alcântara, Captain João Ribeiro Neves and others took part in it. After the Commander of Arms was arrested and the imprisoned soldiers were released, a proclamation was read urging:

Our European brothers defeated despotism (authoritarianism) in Portugal and reestablished good order in the Portuguese nation (…) Soldiers! Bahia is our homeland and we are no less valiant than the Cabreiras and Sepulvedas! We are the saviors of our country; delay is harmful, the despotism and treason of Rio de Janeiro plot against us, we must not allow Brazil to remain in the chains of slavery.

And he concluded:

Long live the constitution and courts in Bahia and Brazil — Long live King Jonh VI, our sovereign for the constitution. March.

The liberal conspirators wanted, as in Portugal, a constitution that would limit royal power. Some were cleverly convinced that the real fight should be to maintain the sovereignty in Brazil, among them the future Marquis of Barbacena, then Marshal Felisberto Caldeira Brant Pontes who, despite being Brazilian, led the government's reaction, together with then Colonel Inácio Luís Madeira de Melo. Fighting continued until the rebels won, and the people proclaimed the new state of affairs in Praça da Câmara. The Governor, Count of Palma, went to the City Council and resigned.

The Portuguese and Brazilians were united and formed a Governing Board. But the situation would not last.

=== Political crisis of 1821–1822 ===
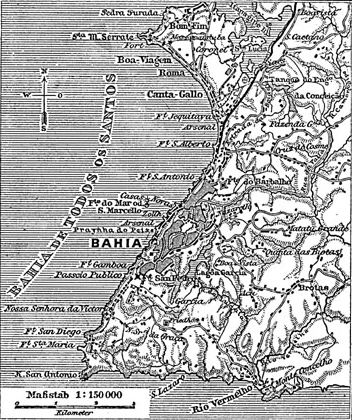
Nautical chart of Bay of All Saints.

With the return of Jonh VI to Portugal (April 1821), with Prince Regent D. Pedro de Alcântara remaining in Rio de Janeiro, who had been ordered to return to Portugal by a letter from the Courts of Lisbon, it became clear to the Brazilians that the former metropolis would not accept the status of the United Kingdom of Portugal, Brazil and the Algarves. Among the troops, united in constitutionalist sentiment, the split between the Portuguese and Brazilians grew more pronounced. Intense hatred resulted in many partial conflicts and rumors that, on July 12, 1821, caused the Portuguese to gather in the barracks to defend themselves against a possible attack by the Brazilians.

On November 12, Portuguese soldiers took to the streets of Salvador, attacking Brazilian soldiers in a physical confrontation in Praça da Piedade, resulting in deaths and injuries. The population, fearful, began a gradual exodus to the Recôncavo region. The year ended with tensions rising.

On January 31, 1822, a new Junta was elected, and on February 11, news arrived that Brigadier Inácio Luís Madeira de Melo had been appointed Commander of Arms for the province of Bahia. He was the soldier who had supported the Count of Palma a year earlier. The order for his appointment arrived four days later. The people of Bahia had a commander who had already declared himself against their ideals. From June 1822 to July 1823, the struggle continued between the provisional government of the province, elected in June, which was in favor of independence, and the Portuguese forces under the command of Brigadier Madeira de Melo, who were concentrated in Salvador.

=== Resistance to Madeira de Melo and the first martyr of Brazil ===
In Bahia, three factions were formed, which would keep the fight going:

- Supporters of maintaining the colonial regime — almost exclusively made up of Portuguese people;
- Constitutionalists of Brazil — defenders of a constitution for Brazil, as a Kingdom, made up of Portuguese and Brazilians;
- Republicans — supporters of political emancipation, with the adoption of a republican regime (similar to the United States), made up almost exclusively of Brazilians.

In command of the Arms was Brigadier Manuel Pedro, who had strengthened the Brazilians, strategically anticipating a fight. His dismissal and the appointment of Madeira de Melo were a severe blow to the national party.

Madeira de Melo's inauguration was prevented by the Brazilians, under the pretext of the lack of minor formalities. Meanwhile, the people began to defend the name of Manoel Pedro. Madeira de Melo sought support from the Portuguese merchants of the city, in addition to the Infantry (12th) and Cavalry regiments and units of the Portuguese Navy. For their part, the Brazilians in Bahia had the Legion of Hunters, the Artillery regiment and the 1st Infantry Regiment.

On February 18, 1822, a council of councilors, judges and the Governing Board met to settle the issue of the inauguration. A military junta was proposed as a solution, under the presidency of Madeira de Melo. In practice, it was his victory over opposing interests.

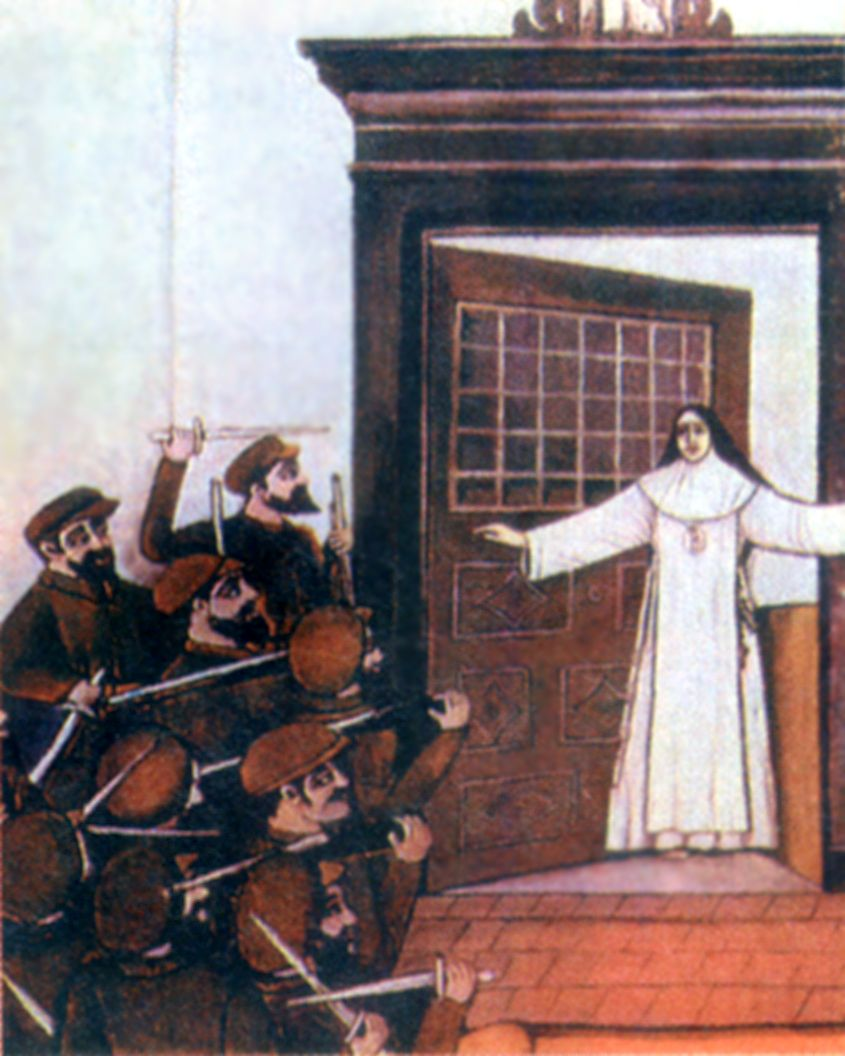
The martyrdom of Joana Angélica on February 19, 1822, at the Lapa Convent.

The Portuguese troops had been on standby since the 16th, while the sailors roamed the streets, making provocations — Madeira de Melo had stated that, should any threat to the constitution occur, he would act without consulting the Military Junta. Victorious, he paraded through the streets, inspecting the fortifications, challenging the garrisons with a national majority. At dawn on the 19th, the first shots were fired at the Fort of São Pedro, where the Portuguese troops had rushed from São Bento. Salvador was transformed into a war zone, and violent clashes occurred in Mercês, Praça da Piedade and Campo da Pólvora.

Despite the fierce defense, the Portuguese troops took the barracks where the 1st Infantry Battalion was meeting. The Portuguese sailors celebrated the victory, having attacked houses, people and invaded the Lapa Convent where some rebels had taken refuge, and assassinated its abbess, Sister Joana Angélica.

The only thing left to do was to take the Fort of São Pedro. Madeira de Melo prepared to bombard the fortification—one of the few entirely on land, in the center of the city. During the siege, they were attacked on the sides of Garcia. On the night of the 21st, the soldiers of the fort withdrew through the sea bulwark, avoiding bloodshed. Brigadier Manuel Pedro was arrested and sent to Lisbon.

In power, the "Portuguese Party" terrified Brazilians. On March 2, 1822, Madeira de Melo finally took the oath before the City Council.

== The war ==
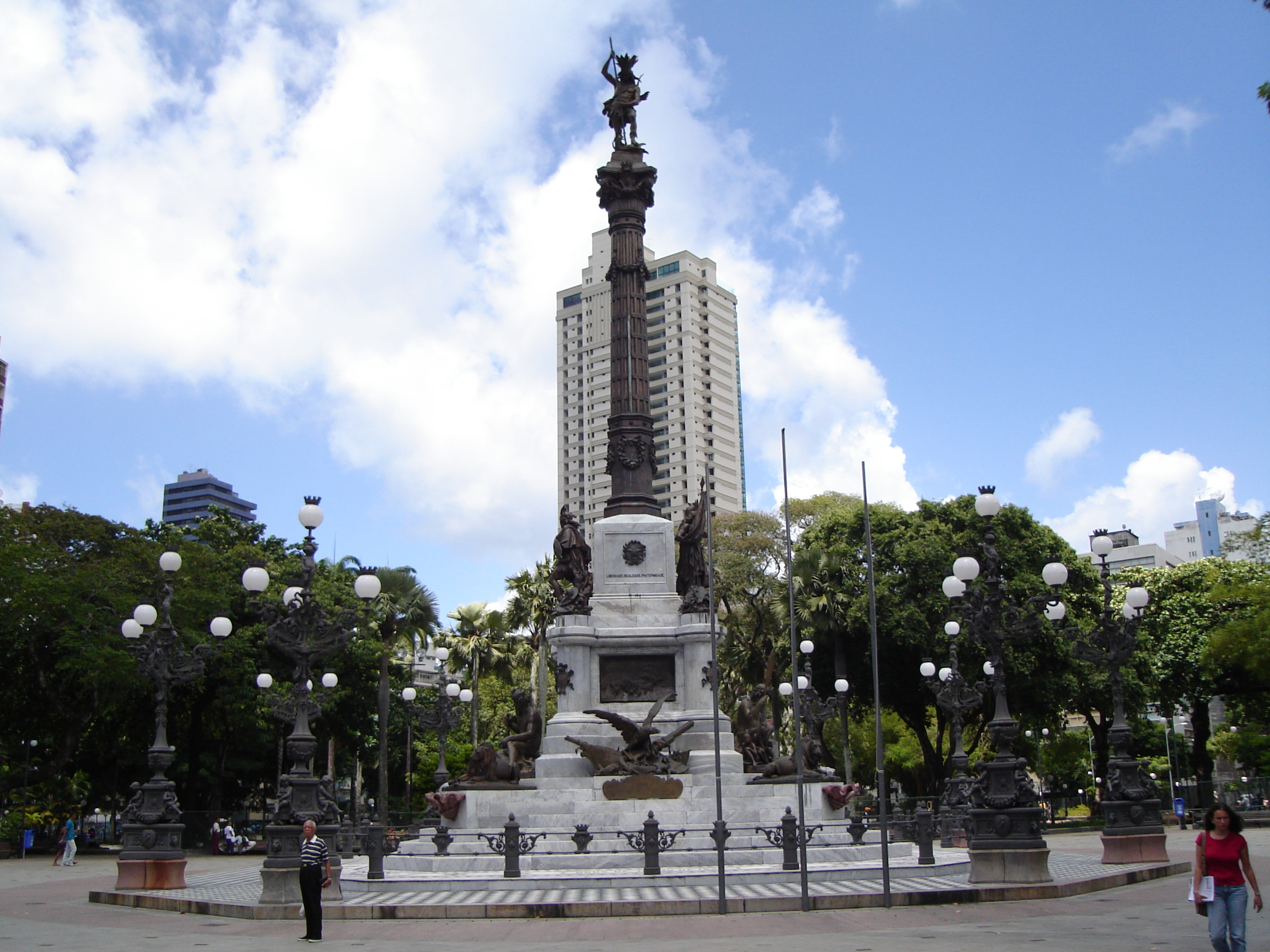
Monument to the Independence of Bahia, located in Campo Grande.

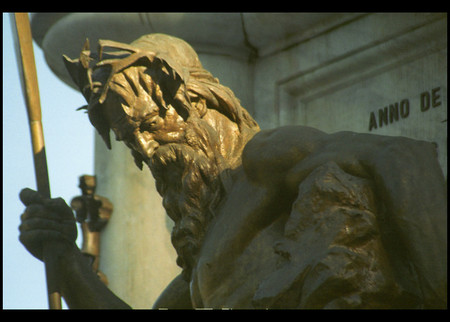
Detail of the Monument

=== July 1822: Bahia in turmoil ===
The Brazilians still in the capital responded by throwing stones at Madeira de Melo's military actions, and during the Saint Joseph procession (March 21, 1822), the Portuguese were stoned.

Regarding this episode, Madeira de Melo wrote:

Then a crowd of blacks gathered in this city to throw stones in some very public places, such as Largo do Teatro and adjacent streets; they took their positions and as soon as a procession of Europeans appeared, they threw a multitude of stones at it (…) When night fell, large groups gathered in different places and stoned all the soldiers and other people they saw to be Europeans (…)—

The newspaper Constitucional, by Francisco Corte Imperial and Francisco Gê Acaiaba de Montezuma (who would later form the first government during the struggles), was responsible for the interests of the people of Bahia, and it gave vent to the feelings of the majority of the people.

The city of Salvador witnessed the ever-increasing exodus of its residents, which increased with the arrival of reinforcements in Madeira de Melo: a ship, one of those carrying troops from Rio de Janeiro back to Portugal, docked in the capital, leaving its soldiers there.

The atmosphere in the Recôncavo was increasingly revolutionary: several strongholds, starting with the Tower House in March 1822, began to welcome Brazilian soldiers from Forte de São Pedro. Metals from various farms were melted down and converted into war material.

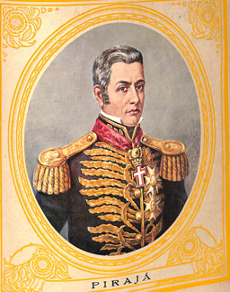
The first phase of the War in Bahia was commanded by Lieutenant Colonel Joaquim Pires de Carvalho e Albuquerque.

Under the leadership of Lieutenant Colonel Joaquim Pires de Carvalho e Albuquerque, a group initially formed by just over 500 men began to take shape as an improvised army. Over time, this number grew to around 1,500 combatants. On the other side, the Portuguese forces were numerically superior, with over 3,000 soldiers. The clashes that followed were isolated and did not involve large numbers of troops. It was a guerrilla war, focused on occupying strategic points in the region.

=== Consultation with municipal councils ===
The deputies of the province of Bahia in the Courts of Lisbon — among them Luís Paulino d'Oliveira Pinto da França, who had been sent by Jonh VI to negotiate with Madeira de Melo (arriving after the outcome of the conflict) — consulted their districts by letter, asking what the municipalities' opinion was on what Bahia's relationship with the metropolis should be. Taking the lead, the towns of Santo Amaro, Cachoeira and São Francisco do Conde, followed by the others, expressed their support for the province to be transferred to the regency of D. Pedro, in Rio de Janeiro. Behind these statements, there was a clear desire to separate from Portugal, which they already considered an oppressive figure.

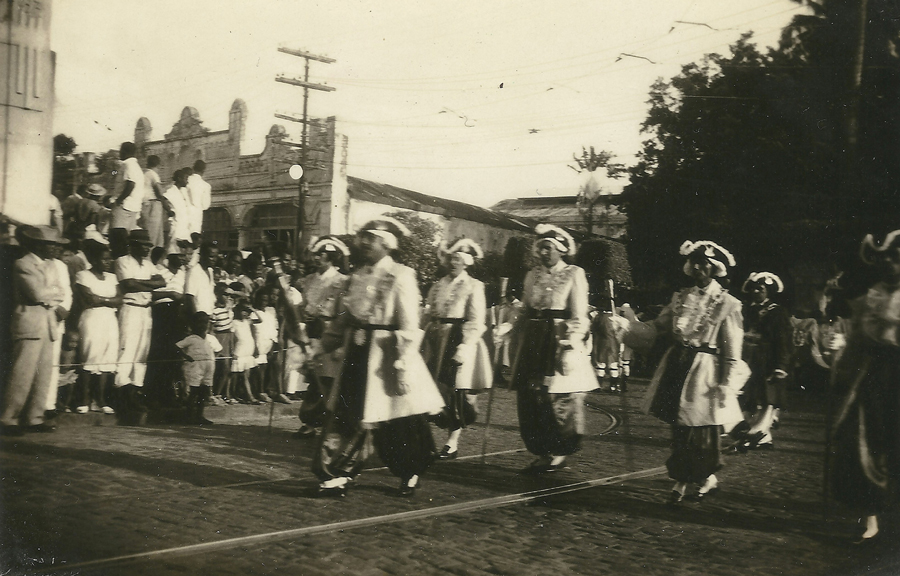

A military schooner was sent by Madeira de Melo to Cachoeira. On June 25, 1822, the following people met in the Cachoeira City Council: Antônio de Cerqueira Lima, José Garcia Pacheco de Aragão, Antônio de Castro Lima, Joaquim Pedreira do Couto Ferraz, Rodrigo Antônio Falcão Brandão, José Fiúza de Almeida and Francisco Gê Acaiaba de Montezuma, future Viscount of Jequitinhonha. The result was a consultation with the people, by the Attorney of the Senate of the Council, "whether they agreed to proclaim His Royal Highness as Constitutional Regent and Perpetual Defender of Brazil, in the same way as had been done in Rio de Janeiro". The people enthusiastically responded "Yes!". In celebration, the town then began a cavalry parade that marched through the streets, followed by a mass. During the popular parade, shots were fired in his direction, coming from the house of a Portuguese man and from the schooner anchored offshore. The shooting continued throughout the night and into the next day.

Others who also participated from the beginning of the struggle against Portugal were the brothers Antônio Pereira Rebouças and Manuel Maurício Rebouças (the father and uncle of the abolitionist André Rebouças), black men, sons of a freed slave. Antônio served as secretary of the Provisional Government Board, acclaimed in June 1822, and participated in all the decisive battles that followed. Manuel Rebouças readily volunteered as a soldier, participating in several conflicts; he was sent by the Cachoeira board to secure Maragogipe's adhesion to the cause of independence. Later, he served as clerk of the General Commissariat of the Patriotic Army, until its dissolution at the end of the war.

=== Formation of the "Defense Board" ===
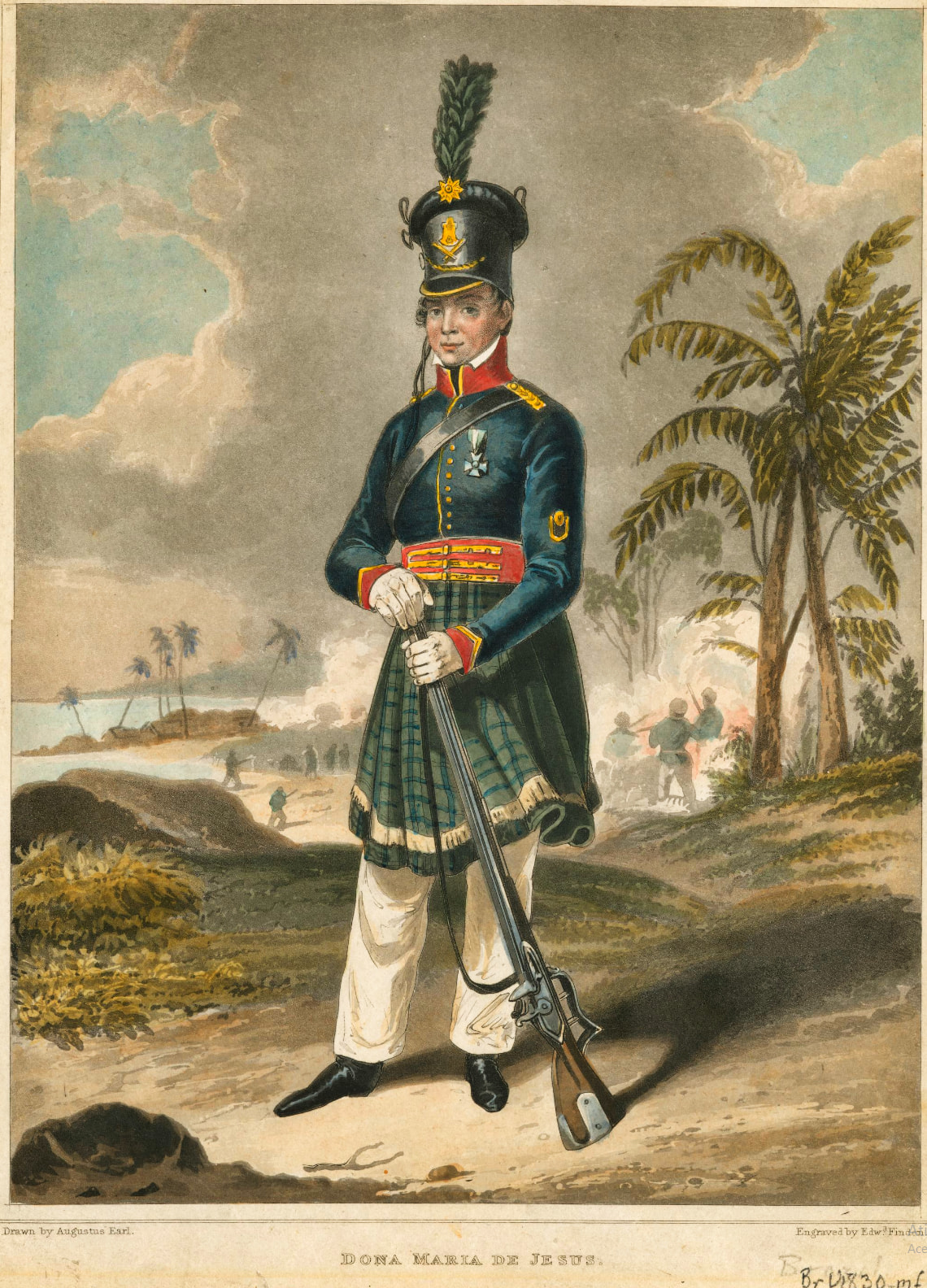
Maria Quitéria, heroine of the Parakeet Battalion, engraving from the book Journal of a Voyage to Brazil, by Maria Graham.

The "Brazilian" supporters met in the city of Maragojipe, 23 kilometers (14,292 miles) from Cachoeira, in November 1822 and decided that everyone would side with D. Pedro and against the Portuguese crown. They proclaimed a Conciliatory and Defense Board to govern the city, in permanent session, and many Portuguese joined in. Among these Brazilians, Rodrigo Antônio Falcão Brandão, later made the first Baron of Belém, and Maria Quitéria de Jesus stood out. A military fund was formed and they urged the commander of the Portuguese schooner to cease the attack, but received a threat in response. The people reacted and the first battle took place to seize the vessel, which, surrounded by land and water, resisted until the capture and arrest of the survivors on June 28, 1822. The towns of the Recôncavo gradually joined the Cachoeira. Salvador became the target of greater oppression by Madeira de Melo, and the exodus of the population gained intensity.

The municipalities organized themselves for combat, training troops and digging trenches. Adherences arrived from the hinterland. Strategic positions were taken on the islands of Recôncavo, in Pirajá and Cabrito. Hostilities began and news of them spread throughout the Province and the rest of the country. Itaparica had already joined. Madeira de Melo sent an expedition there, which arrived shooting. The people fled, swelling the ranks that were concentrated in Recôncavo.

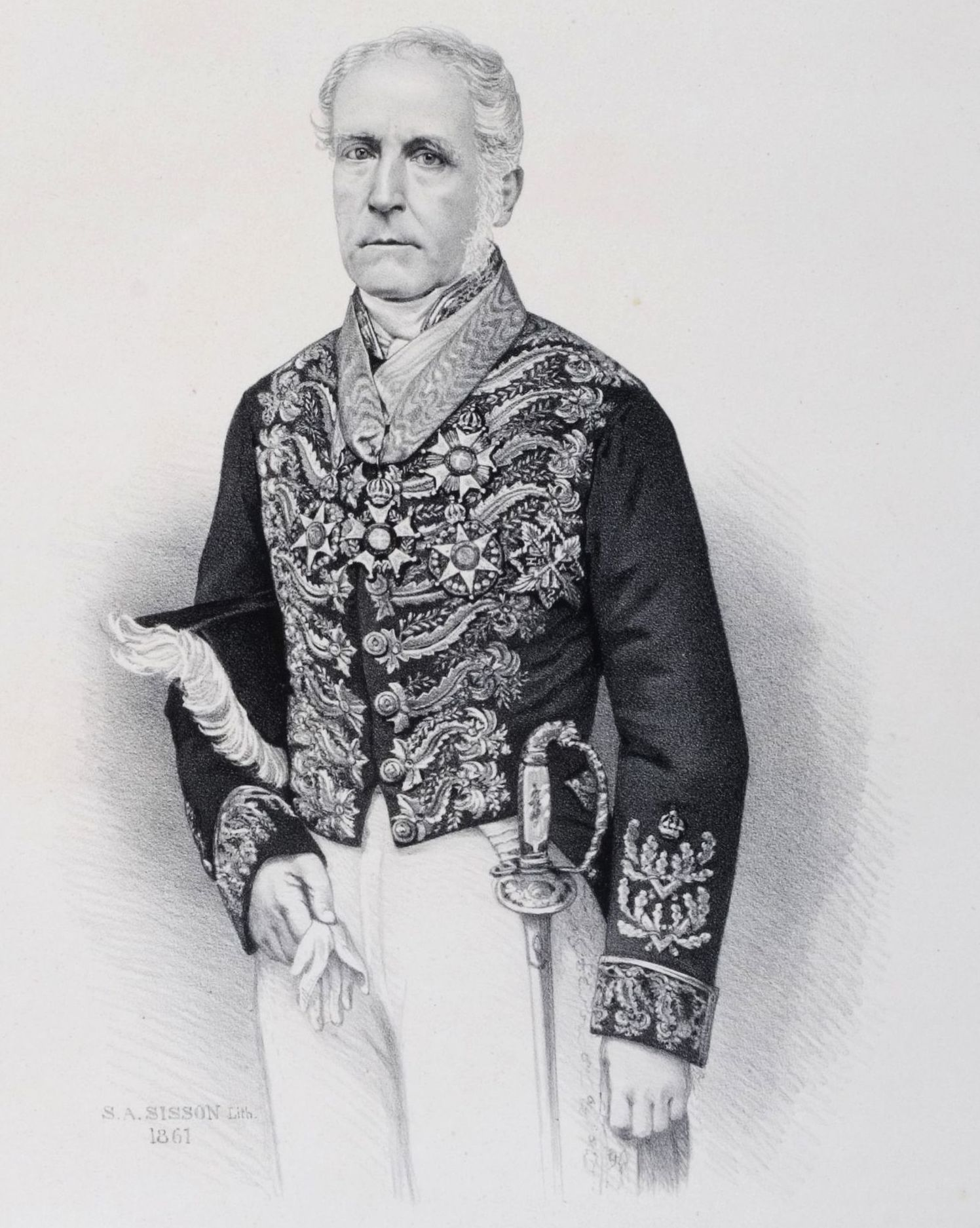
Miguel Calmon, future Marquis of Abrantes, first governor of "free" Bahia

A new government was organized in Cachoeira to lead the resistance on September 22, 1822, under the presidency of Miguel Calmon do Pin e Almeida, the future Marquis of Abrantes.

All these movements were communicated to the Prince Regent. 750 soldiers sent from Portugal as reinforcements to maintain order in Bahia arrived in August.

After the Independence of Brazil was proclaimed (September), in October 1822 the first reinforcement for the Bahian patriots arrived from Rio de Janeiro, under the command of the French general Pierre Labatut. The troops were almost entirely Portuguese, since a truly national army did not yet exist. Labatut had left Rio for Maceió to take command of the Brazilian troops, "with 200 soldiers from the Militia Battalion, 40 Hunters and 34 officers who were to help organize the Brazilian Army in Bahia", in addition to war material, consisting of five thousand rifles, artillery, pistols, spears, machetes and cartridges. Labatut was "one of the veterans of the Napoleonic campaigns and had all the requirements to face Madeira".

His landing was prevented, and he had to dock in Maceió, in Alagoas, from where he headed to Recife, then departed for Sergipe, where he gathered contingents and continued on to the Recôncavo da Bahia. In Recife, Labatut managed to gain the support of Pernambuco and the offer of around 700 soldiers commanded by Major Falcão Lacerda, who were also joined by 200 soldiers from Paraíba.

Labatut assumed command of the operations, and was later replaced in this role by Colonel José Joaquim de Lima e Silva, who commanded the Emperor's Battalion, with almost eight hundred men, sent by Dom Pedro to reinforce the Brazilian troops in Bahia.

After receiving reinforcements from Pernambuco, on November 3, Labatut divided the Brazilian Army into two brigades: (...) the one on the left, commanded by Colonel Felisberto Gomes, with six hundred men from the Torre battalions, therefore from Bahia, and which occupied it as far as Itapuã; and the one on the right, commanded by Major José de Barros Falcão, which was located on the enemy's border line from Itapuã to Engenho do Cabrito, replacing Militia Colonel Rodrigo Falcão Brandão, who was commanding the forces stationed in Cachoeira.

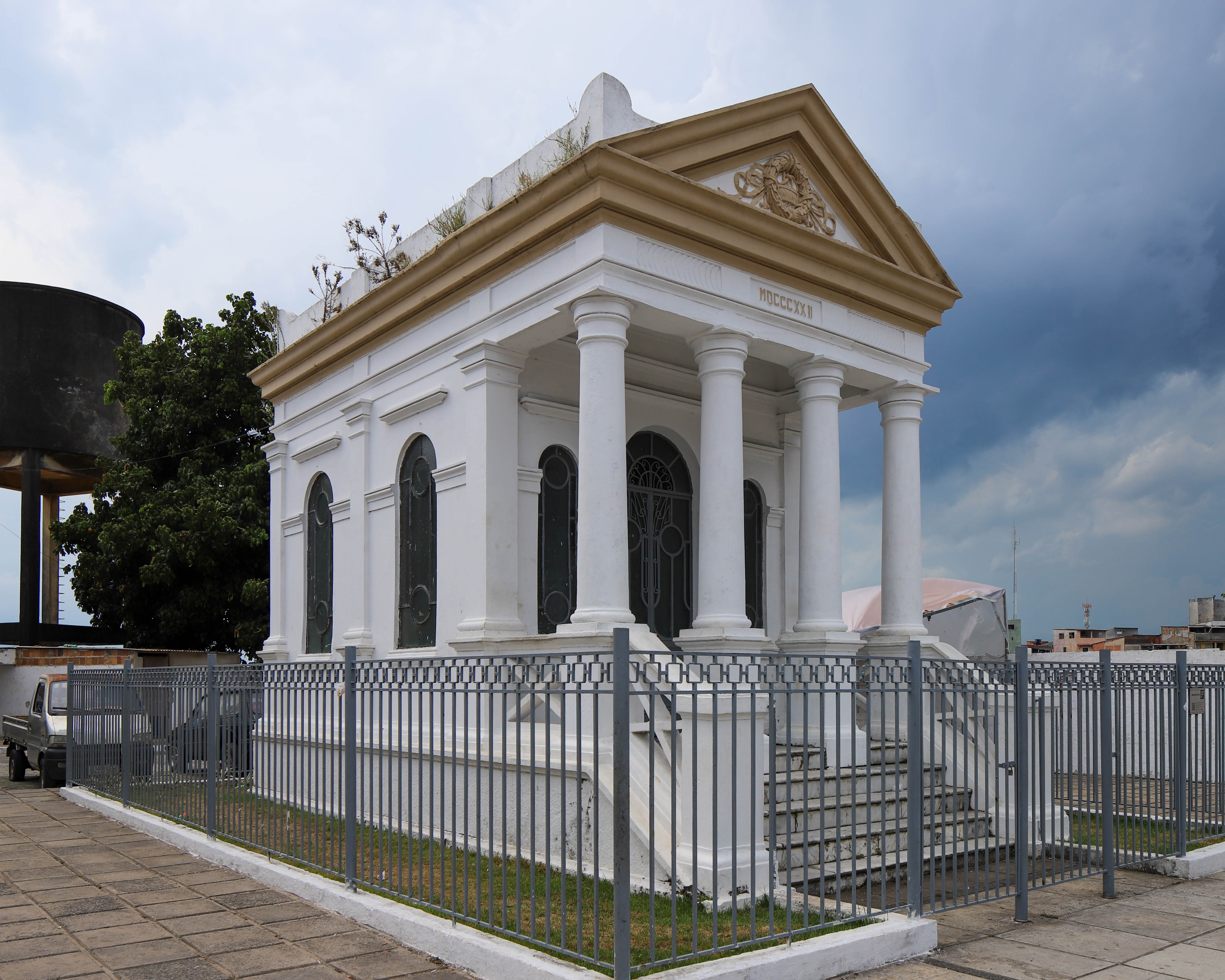
Labatut Pantheon, a memorial building to the general, where his remains are located, in the Pirajá neighborhood, in Salvador, Bahia.

=== Battle of Cabrito ===
The battle of Cabrito was once again an attempt by the Portuguese to break through and open a path to the north from Bahia. The battle lasted almost all day, as the Portuguese attacked, with the help of guns, or locals so that the Brazilians could build a war factory, but these resisters would enter and receive reinforcements. The Portuguese will retire until the end of the day.

=== Battle of Pirajá ===
Having received reinforcements, Madeira de Melo struck a major blow against the Brazilian troops in Pirajá, leading his forces to Estradas das Boiadas (today located in the Liberdade neighborhood). As Tobias Monteiro recorded in "The Making of Independence":

The battle was tremendous, the resistance heroic; For almost five hours of refreshments, taking care of the reinforcements required by the city and to avoid the two-party army, the independents were at the point of recovery and would listen to the best point of defence.

Now we galgavam the attackers on the flanks of the mountains, certain to remove vengeance from the enemy, when we lift the left touch of the cavalry forward and reduce it. O cornet, to that major Barros Falcão, who commanded the action on that point, gave the order to hit retreat, trocara, for his own count, or toque destined to announce to the derrota the arms of arms, at the head of the unexpected attack, from where I see the panic and panic of the portugueses. The providential stratagem of Luís Lopes, who was also called the Portuguese supporter of the cause of Brazil, immediately transformed into action. Disturbed by the presence of this imaginary knight, as we did not count, the Portuguese were extremely indecisive and, finally, recovered. Without a moment's delay, the Brazilians prevailing over the situation, we order a bayonet charge. The almost victorious hosts will now roll over the plank, fleeing from the sea, envolving their reserves in the same scattered and broken substance.

After this disaster and the last disaster in Italy, the Madeira army was completely destroyed and could not renew its reinforcements to dominate the capital.

=== Siege of Salvador ===
In May 1823, the squadron commanded by Thomas Cochrane arrived off the coast of the province to participate in the maritime blockade of the provincial capital. The final defeat of Madeira occurred on July 2.

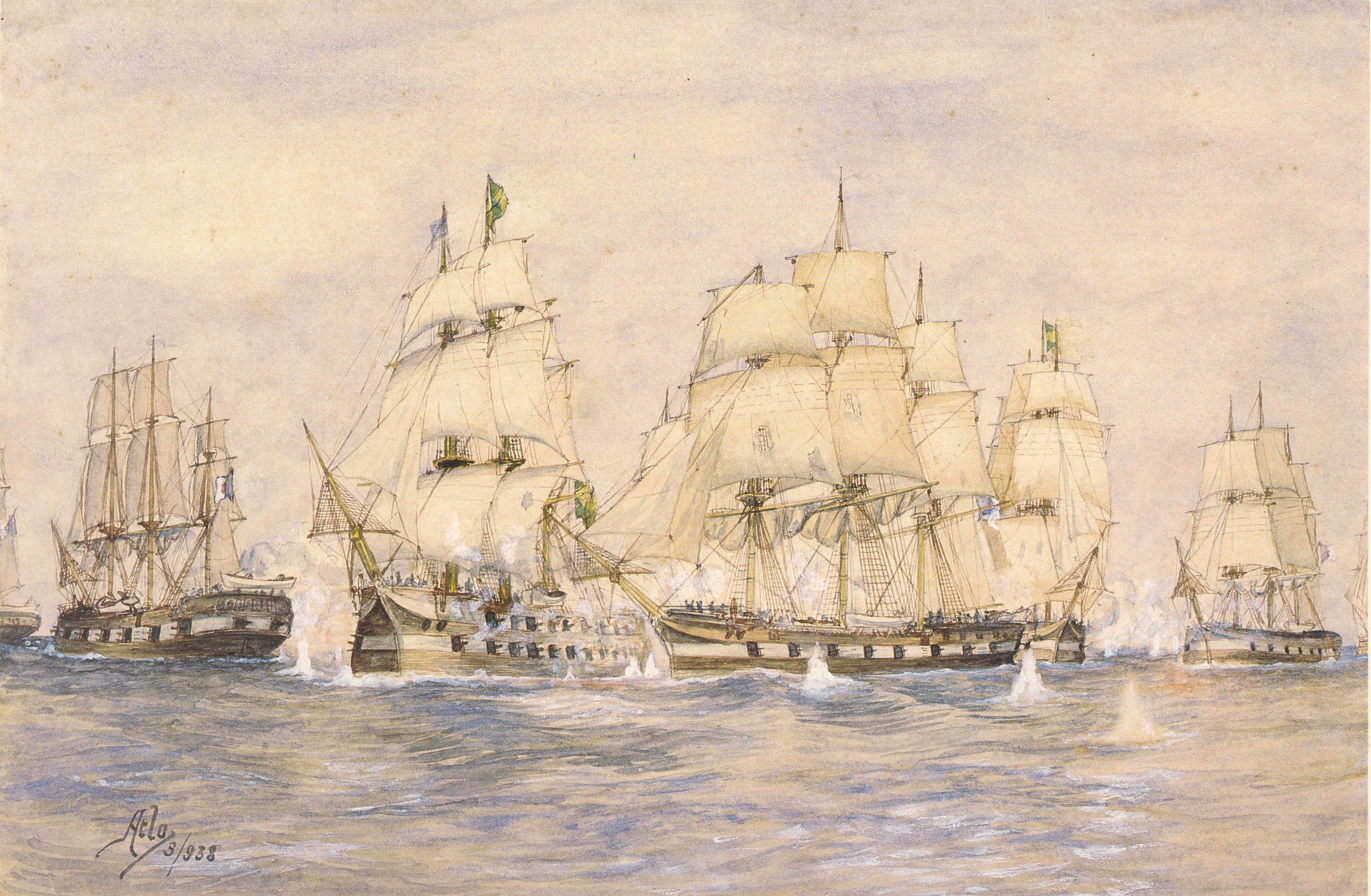
Battle of May 4, 1823, with the Imperial Navy led by Thomas Cochrane, in the open sea near Salvador, Bahia.

There was no surrender by Madeira de Melo; he simply embarked, defeated, with what troops he had left in the capital, about four thousand and five hundred men, who took 83 vessels. The first Brazilian troops to enter the capital were those stationed in Pirajá and continued on to São Caetano, under the command of Colonel João de Souza Meira Girão, along a stretch of the old "Estrada das Boiadas" that later came to be called Estrada da Liberdade (in English: "Freedom Road"). According to tradition, they were received by a triumphal arch made of flowers by the sisters of the Convent of Solitude. Also there were José Joaquim de Lima e Silva, leading the Emperor's Battalion and commander-in-chief, and Colonel Antero José Ferreira de Brito with the men who took the trenches of Lapinha and Soledade.

Other troops entered the city, occupying its barracks and key defense points:

- 1. Felisberto Gomes Caldeira left Armação and Rio Vermelho towards Tororó, Barra, Graça and the Avenida Sete de Setembro, occupying the barracks of the Campo da Pólvora, Palma, Gamboa and the Forte de São Pedro, and also Casa da Pólvora, in Aflitos;
- 2. Major José Leite Pacheco, leaving Armação and Pituba, continues through the area conquered by Major Silva Castro in Cruz de Cosme and goes to Carmo. They occupy the Carmo Convent, and posts in São Bento, Piedade, Jerusalém (or Hospício), Novitiate (current São Joaquim) and Santa Tereza.

In total, 8,686 officers and soldiers arrived in Salvador on July 2, not counting the more than a thousand women who accompanied them in the assistance, cooking and relief work.

It must be acknowledged that the blockade of the city of Salvador immobilized the army commanded by Madeira de Mello and the squadron of José Felix in their plan to invade Rio de Janeiro. But it is fair to acknowledge that Bahia was not alone. The solidarity of Sergipe, Alagoas, Rio Grande do Norte and Ceará was very valuable – of the many people from Sergipe, Alagoas, Sergipe, Paraíba, Rio Grande do Norte and Ceará, not to mention the people from Rio de Janeiro, São Paulo and Minas Gerais who participated in the war for Brazilian Independence in Bahia (TAVARES, 2005, p. 225).

=== Indigenous participation ===
The participation of indigenous people in the political process had been a constant since the colonial period. This continued during Brazil's independence process, intensifying especially in the 1820s. Indigenous peoples were not just spectators, but protagonists in an important moment in national history. The participation of indigenous people in the conflict was manifested not only by their direct engagement in local political movements and articulations, but also in the way they mobilized old alliances, their leaders and knowledge regarding the functioning of the colonial and imperial administration.

One example occurred in Cimbres, Pernambuco, a region that experienced intense political and social transformations. There, indigenous communities mobilized to guarantee their rights and preserve their lands in the face of a changing scenario. Contrary to the traditional narrative that often marginalizes indigenous actions, there were communities that were aware of the political movements of the period and actively sought to influence the course of decisions that affected their lives.

In addition to the indigenous leaders who participated in assemblies and political discussions, demanding recognition and autonomy amid the process of building the Brazilian State, the interactions between indigenous people and the new emerging powers show a complex dynamic, in which alliances were formed and disputes over territory and rights were fought. This participation was not limited to military aspects; indigenous people were also involved in diplomatic negotiations and sought to ensure their voice in the new political structures that were emerging. The defense of lands was then inseparable from indigenous political participation, and the Cimbres indigenous people used petitions, letters and other formal means, combining legal practices absorbed from the colonial period with local strategies of resistance. The fight for territory was then a solid form of political action, given that the loss of lands also meant the social and cultural disintegration of their respective communities.

The indigenous people of Vila Verde, in the former captaincy of Porto Seguro (today the state of Bahia), played an active and strategic role in the Independence of Brazil. On November 24, 1822, the local council, formed mainly by indigenous leaders, organized a ceremony to acclaim D. Pedro I as Constitutional Emperor and Perpetual Defender of Brazil. The event, which brought together around two hundred people in the main square of the village, marked the official adhesion of the indigenous community to the fight for separation from Portugal.

The history of Vila Verde begins with the Jesuit settlement of Espírito Santo, founded in 1634. In 1759, with the reforms of the Portuguese government, the village became a civil village and the council began to be commanded by indigenous people. This status gave the residents certain rights, such as land ownership and participation in local government. When they learned that D. Pedro had been acclaimed in Rio de Janeiro, the indigenous people of Vila Verde decided to break once and for all with the Portuguese rule that still resisted in Bahia, mainly under the command of General Madeira de Mello (This occurred in a context of conflicts that culminated in what we call the Independence of Brazil in Bahia).

In a letter sent to D. Pedro, the indigenous people said that they were "the first" in the Porto Seguro region to support the "holy cause of independence", showing that they wanted to be protagonists of change and end colonial "servility". On the same day, indigenous groups went to Porto Seguro and Trancoso to ensure that similar ceremonies were also held in these villages, even facing resistance from those who were still against separation from Brazil. At various times, they also helped in the armed defense of the villages.

The Act of Acclamation written by the Vila Verde City Council shows how the indigenous people knew how to use the political language of the time. In the document, they speak of "liberty", "patriotism" and "constitutional monarchy" to justify their choice and ask to be recognized as citizens of the new country. In addition, they requested the appointment of Manoel Ferraz, a white man, to be the village's clerk and director, a strategic choice, following the logic of exchanging political support for public office, a common practice at the time. The participation of the indigenous people of Vila Verde shows a reality that challenges the image of indigenous passivity during Independence. They acted with political awareness, knew how to negotiate and were willing to fight for their rights. By supporting Independence, they also sought to guarantee their autonomy, their lands and their place as citizens in the new Brazil.

== Representation in popular culture ==
=== Folklore ===
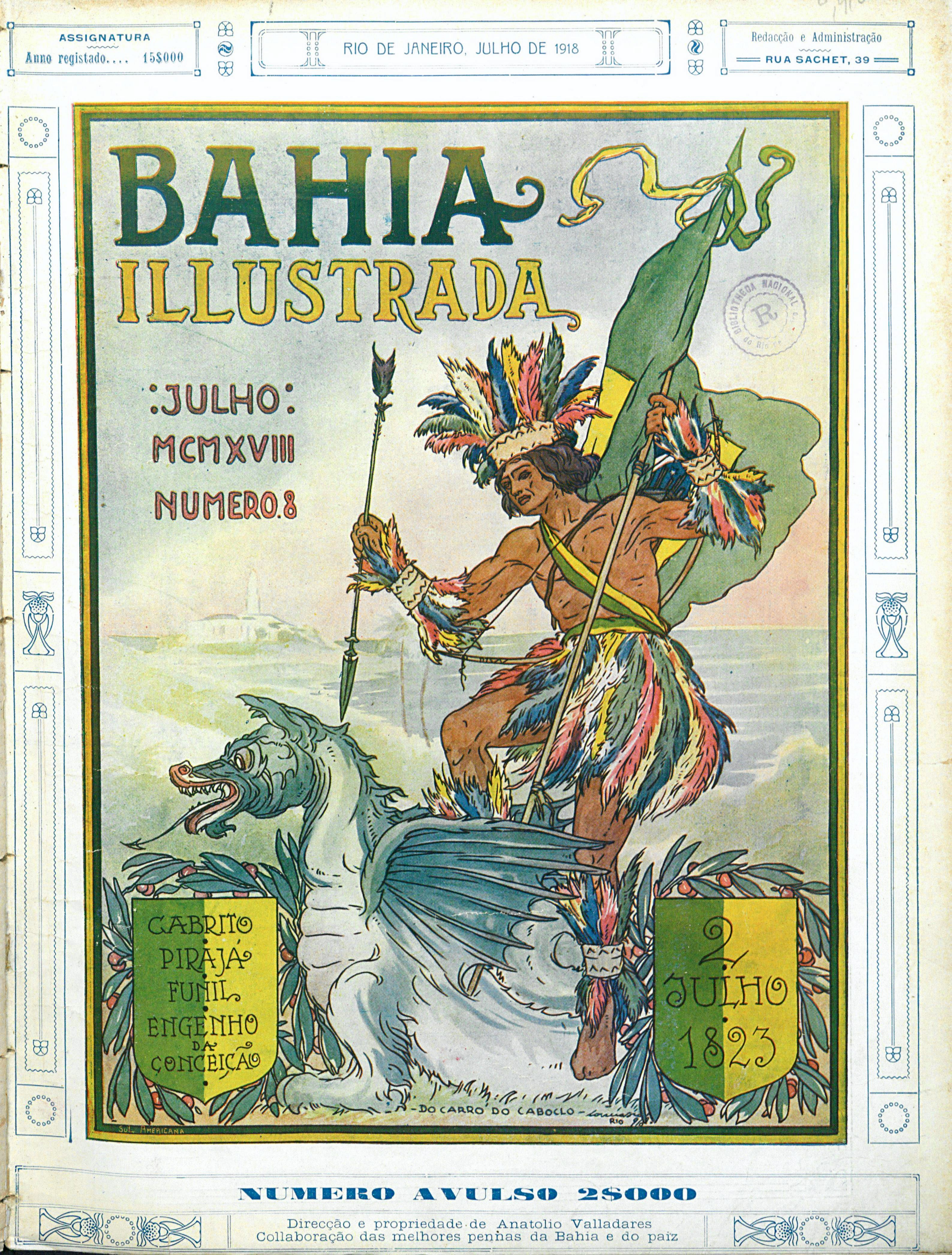
Allegory of "Caboclo" illustrating the edition of the magazine Bahia Illustrada, in 1918.

The long left a varied legacy in folklore. The historian José Calasans recorded some verses that were sung by both sides (Portuguese and Brazilian): (Note: In literal translation to English)

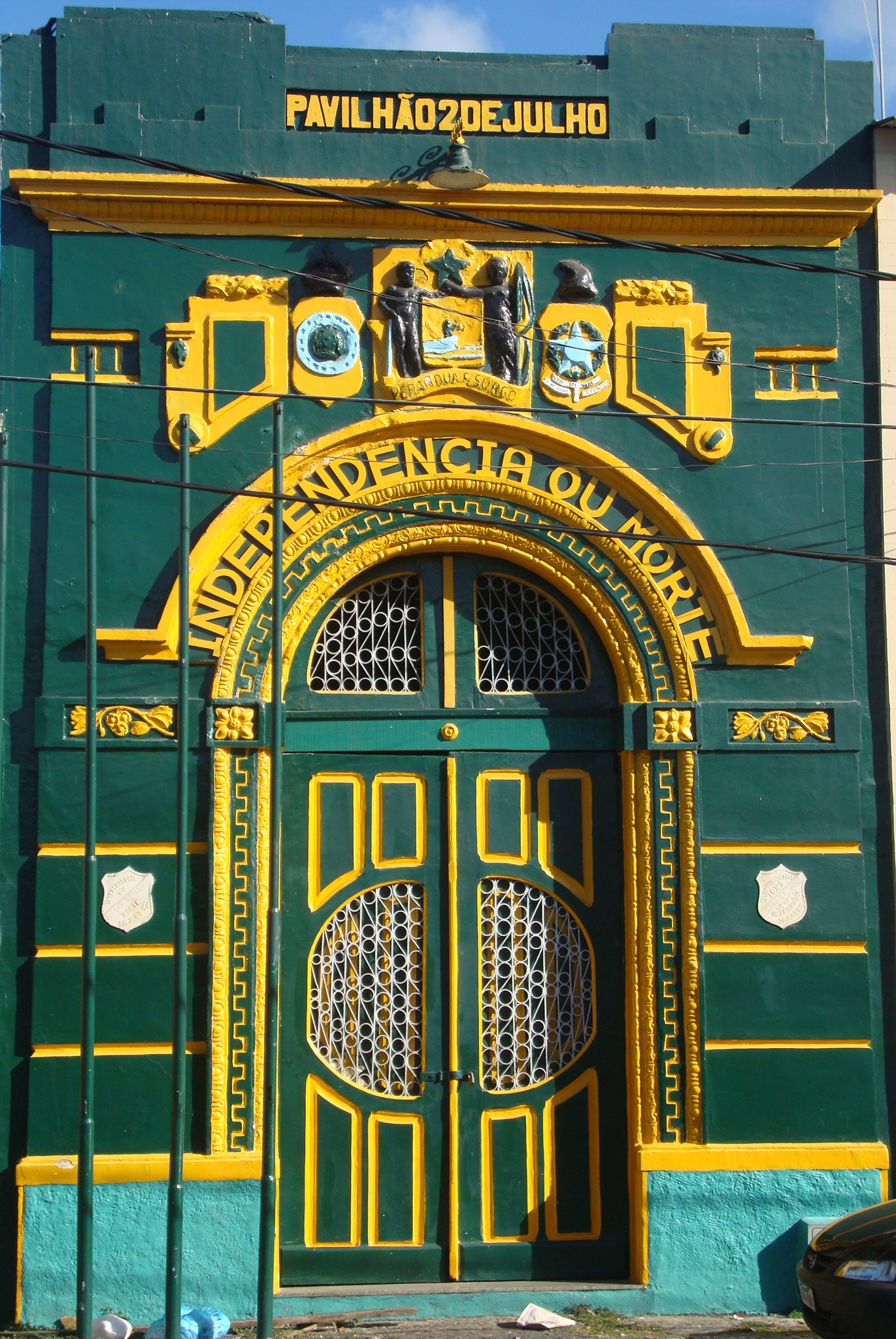
Pavilhão 2 de Julho, in Salvador, built for the Centenary of the Independence of Bahia, and to preserve the memory of the 2nd of July Festival.

- From the Portuguese, parodying what was then the Brazilian Anthem:

Brave Brazilian people

Of the people of Guinea Who left the five wounds (Note: "Five wounds" referred to the Portuguese flag.)

On the branches of coffee (Note: "Branches of coffe" is an allusion to the flag adopted by Pedro I.)

- From the Brazilians, against their opponents, the verses:

Labatut swore to Pedro,

When he kissed his hand, To drive this cursed nation out of Bahia!

Madeira wanted to crown himself! He cast a lucky spell,

He got bad luck!

=== Divine interventions ===
Calasans also records a fact narrated by folklorist João da Silva Campos, in which Saint Anthony of Padua stars in a curious intervention in the withdrawal of Brigadier Manuel Pedro's troops from Salvador, thus enabling the organization of resistance forces in Cachoeira.

The king's soldiers retreated hastily, faced with the repeated blows of the strange warrior in burel who, moreover, seemed to be armored against the bullets (...) Later the Portuguese explained the reason for having given ground to them. Then the nationals, who had not seen any friar at the head of their platoons, attributed to Saint Anthony the feat of espousing the cause of the Independence of Brazil, having opposed his compatriots with weapons in hand. —

In the battle of Rio Vermelho, it was the appearance of Senhora Santana who, while the troops were resting, warned them of the enemy's arrival, thus avoiding a surprise attack and enabling the Brazilians to win.

=== Bugler Lopes ===
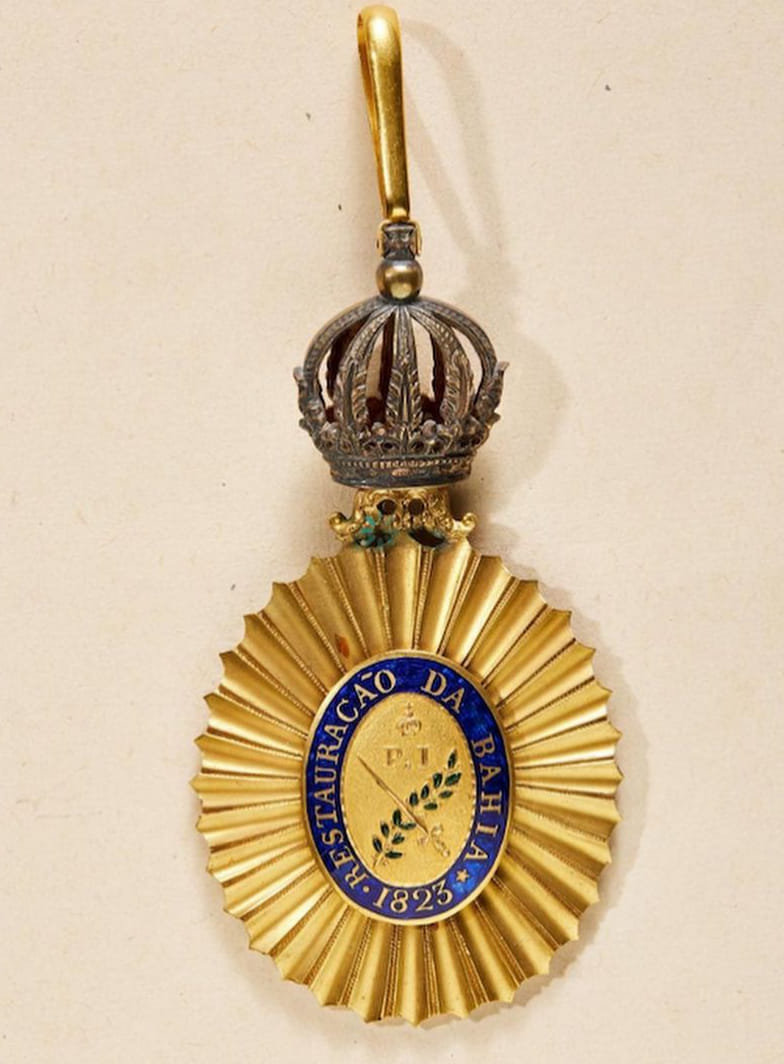
Medal of the Restoration of Bahia (also known as the Medal of Independence). Medal instituted by Emperor Dom Pedro I on July 2, 1825 to celebrate the withdrawal of Portuguese forces from the city of Salvador and to reward the officers and soldiers of the Army who fought in the War of Independence in Bahia. It was later extended to the officers and sailors of the squadron that blockaded the port.

According to José Calasans, it was possibly the historian Inácio Acioli de Cerqueira e Silva, in his work Memórias Históricas e Políticas da Bahia (in English: Historical and Political Memories of Bahia), who first explained the Bahian victory in the Battle of Pirajá as the result of a wrong bugle call. Fearing that he would be surrounded, Major José de Barros Falcão, in command of a key position, had ordered the retreat, but the bugler Luís Lopes, a Portuguese who was fighting on the Brazilian side, did the opposite: he first gave the signal for the cavalry to advance and then shot them: the enemies, believing that reinforcements were arriving, fled in disarray and the Brazilians, almost defeated, emerged victorious from the battle.

The episode described by Acioli is repeated in Braz do Amaral's work, but Baron of Rio Branco, despite being familiar with that work, omits this passage. The passage had acquired a legendary tone until further research revealed the record made by D. Pedro II in his diary, about the report given to the Emperor by Baron of Cajaíba, who had taken part in the fighting:

a Portuguese bugle caller who was breaking up the Portuguese army by blowing his horns, and on that day, when he sounded the retreat, he made the Portuguese advance and scatter towards the Cabrito field and the city, as soon as they heard the cheers given to my father by the major of Pernambuco Santiago. —

—

=== The "Caboclo" figure ===
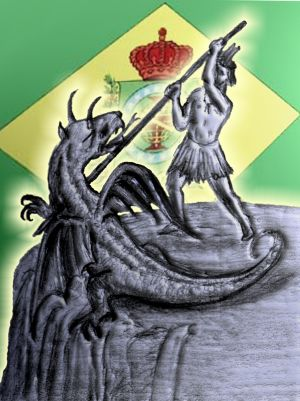
The Allegory of Caboclo, where the dragon is a symbol of the colonizer's oppression.

The indigenous element played an important role in the struggles, symbolically identified as the "true Brazilian", the owner of the land, who had joined forces with the other combatants. Bahia always paid him ostentatious tributes and, in 1896, on the monument erected in the capital of Bahia, the figure of the caboclo is on top — just like that of Admiral Horatio Nelson on Nelson's Column in London — that important landmark.

In the city of Caetité, which annually holds the Festa do Dois de Julho (July 2nd Festival in English) with great pomp, the figure of a cabocla appears on one of the floats, killing the "Dragon of Tyranny", which represents the defeated colonizer.

=== Samba school ===
In 2023, the Beija-Flor de Nilópolis Samba School, from the Rio Carnival, presented the theme "Brava Gente! The Cry of the Excluded in the Bicentennial of Independence", celebrating the 200 years of the Independence of Bahia.

== Remnants: the "Mata-Maroto" ==
Derogatorily calling the Portuguese marotos (the same as marujos (Note: "Sailors" in Portuguese), since they came to Brazil by sea), during the regency period (about a decade after the battles, therefore), as soon as the news of the abdication of D. Pedro I spread, in the capital and in cities in the interior such as Rio de Contas and Caetité, the natives persecuted the Portuguese.

In Salvador and Recôncavo, the worst incidents occurred especially in 1831, when João Gonçalves Cezimbra, assuming the government, promised to appoint only Brazilians to command the battalions. The Portuguese Francisco Antônio de Sousa Paranhos killed the Brazilian Vitor Pinto de Castro, a crime that further inflamed tempers. At one point, there was talk of breaking up the state with the creation of a federation.

== See also ==
- Independence of Brazil
- Garcia d'Ávila Tower House
- Joana Angélica
- Maria Quitéria
- Thomas Cochrane
- Urânia Vanério
