= Entrada do Exército Libertador =

1930 painting by Presciliano Silva

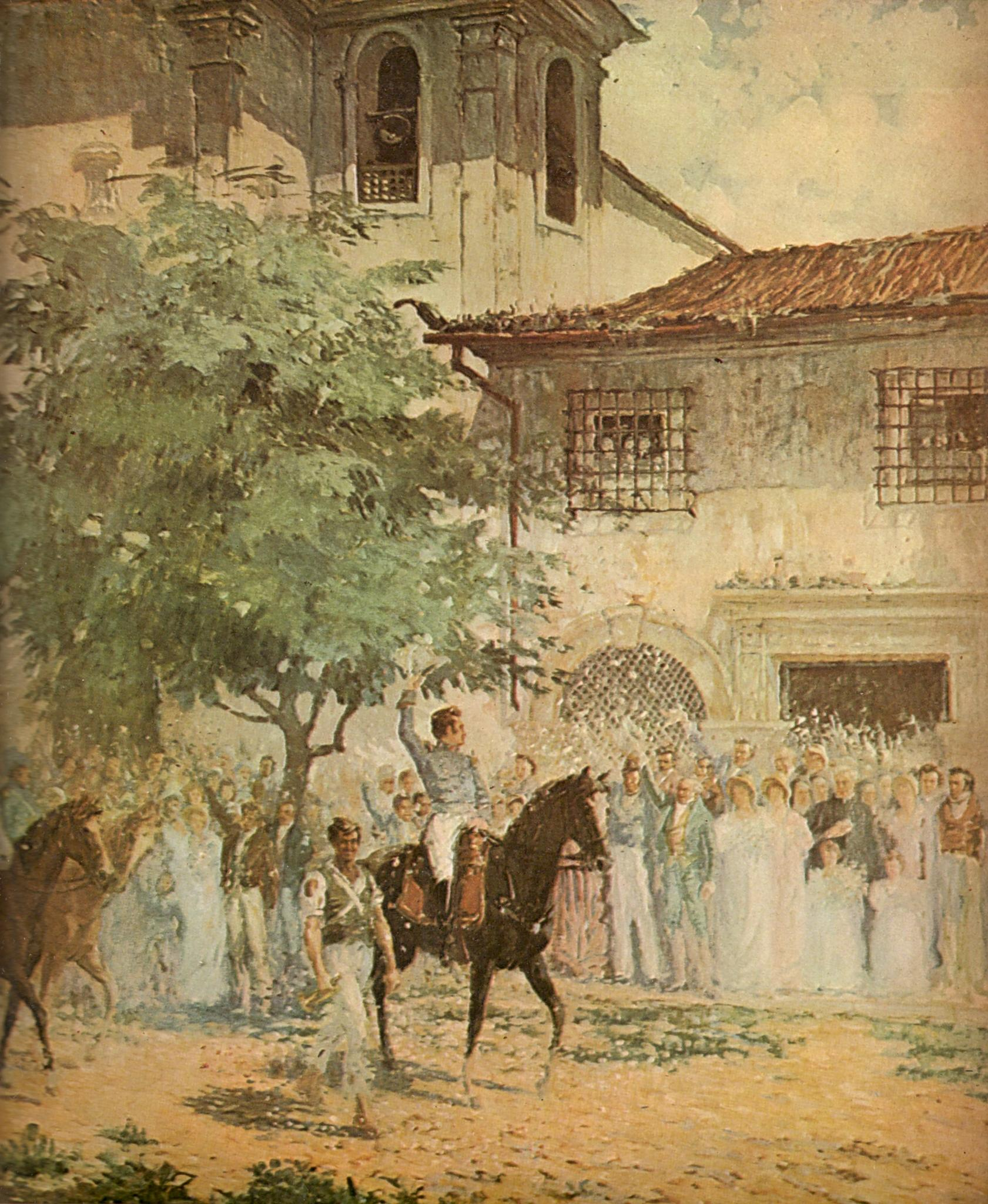
- Detail of the painting, highlighting General Lima e Silva on horseback, accompanied by the bugler Lopes.
- Artist: Presciliano Silva
- Year: 1930
- Dimensions: 300 × 150
- Location: Memorial of the Municipal Chamber of Salvador, Salvador, Bahia, Brazil

Entrada do Exército Libertador (English: Entry of the Liberation Army) is the title of the painting by Brazilian artist Presciliano Silva, recalling the final moment of the struggle for Independence of Bahia, with the entry of Brazilian troops into the city of Salvador on July 2, 1823.

== History ==
The work, completed in 1930, is the largest by Bahian artist Presciliano Silva. The preserved study drawings are housed in the Carlos Costa Pinto Museum, also in the capital of Bahia, Salvador.

It was commissioned by the then mayor of Salvador, Francisco de Souza.

== Presciliano Silva ==
Born on May 17, 1883, in Salvador, Presciliano was a painter and sculptor. He was heavily influenced by Impressionism and Pointillism. He painted portraits of important figures, but became best known for his religious paintings. The historical canvas depicting the Independence of Bahia was painted based on a lithograph by Bento José Rufino Capinam. His creative process included several charcoal studies by the painter, which belong to the Carlos Costa Pinto Museum Collection.

== Description ==
The painting shows troops of the Pacification Army, led by General Lima e Silva, entering through an archway filled with foliage, topped by a banner bearing the inscription: "July 2, 1823." In front of the Convent of Solitude, figures linked to the clergy and the bourgeoisie can be seen, identifiable by their attire. Men and women are depicted dressed in the fashion of the Empire. The female figures wore light fabrics, while the men wore short vests and tight breeches tucked into their riding boots. The light-colored and pastel-hued clothing was a symbol of social status.

In the distance from the façade, lower-class spectators almost merge with the battalion. The painting by the Soteropolitan painter depicts the euphoria of the spectators as they welcomed the victorious army.

The work was inaugurated in a solemn ceremony held on July 2, 1930, at 3 pm, in the Noble Hall of the City Hall of Salvador, which at the time was located in the city's Municipal Palace.
