= Battle of Cachoeira =

Part of the Brazilian War of Independence

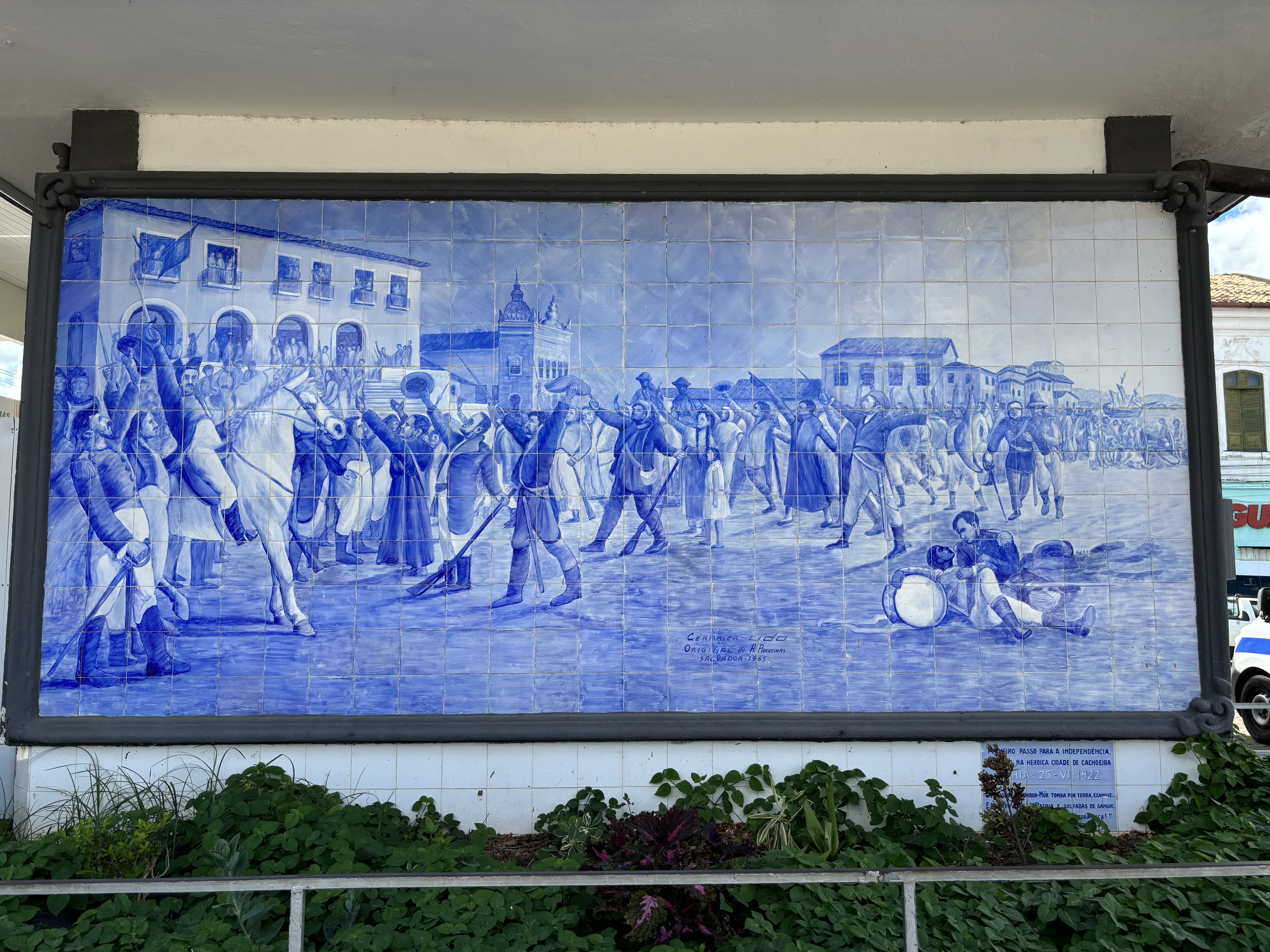
Location	Cachoeira, Bahia, Brazil
Result	Brazilian victory

Belligerents
Kingdom of Brazil	Portuguese Empire

The Battle of Cachoeira (Brazilian Portuguese: Batalha de Cachoeira) took place between June 25 to 28, 1822, during the Brazilian struggle for independence in the Province of Bahia. In response, Governor Inácio Luís Madeira de Melo sent a gunboat to the city in an attempt to intimidate the local population and prevent the spread of rebellion. The gunboat was repelled, which encouraged other municipal councils to join the pro-independence movement and contribute to the formation of a provisional governing junta. The episode is generally regarded as one of the events that contributed to the defeat of Portuguese forces in Bahia and to the consolidation of Brazilian independence.

== Background ==
At the time, Bahia was governed militarily by Madeira de Melo, who had been appointed by the Portuguese Cortes and supported the reoccupation of Brazil by Portugal. His position was backed by merchants connected to colonial trade interests and by troops from Portugal. Local elites, who controlled the municipal councils and maintained their own armed forces, feared losing the privileges they had obtained after the end of colonial rule. As a result, some of them came to support the forces loyal to the prince regent, which they saw as a means of securing autonomy from Portugal. Portuguese authorities also intended to use Bahia as a base for further operations against Rio de Janeiro.

== Battle ==
After the Cachoeira City Council declared its loyalty to Pedro I, Madeira de Melo dispatched the gunboat to suppress the revolt. On the morning of June 25, local forces gathered in Praça da Aclamação. These forces consisted largely of civilians. The gunboat, positioned on the Paraguaçu River, opened fire on Cachoeira in response to the mobilization. One of those hit by the shelling was Manoel da Silva Soledade, also known as Tambor Soledade. Residents and local militia then mobilized to prevent further damage to the town. The weapons used by the population were largely improvised. Although historians don't know exactly what led to the Portuguese defeat, local residents today theorize that low tide had exposed sandbanks in the Paraguaçu River, which may have hindered the vessel's movements.

== See also ==
- Independence of Bahia
- Brazilian War of Independence
