= O Corneteiro Lopes =

- Directed by: Lázaro Faria
- Starring: Nuno Lopes; Thalma de Freitas; Leandro Firmino; Gideon Rosa; Marcelo Prado; Celso Júnior
- Release date: 2003
- Running time: 21 minutes
- Country: Brazil
- Language: Portuguese

O Corneteiro Lopes (lit. 'The Bugler Lopes') is a 2003 Brazilian short film directed by Lázaro Faria. This film, the fourth work by the Bahian director, loosely retells the story of an event that occurred during Brazil's wars of independence, following the declaration of Dom Pedro I.

The work was produced with an award from the 2002-Cine Notice, from the Government of the State of Bahia.

== Synopsis ==
The film is set in Bahia under siege by Portuguese troops, who are gradually eroding the resistance forces commanded by General Labatut. When a fierce offensive begins, the commander orders Luiz Lopes (a Portuguese bugler who was on the side of the Bahian resistance) to sound the "retreat." However, for ambiguous reasons, the bugler instead sounds "advance cavalry, to slaughter." At the sound, the Portuguese troops believe the Bahians have secured reinforcements and retreat. Thus came the victory of the Battle of Pirajá, decisive for Bahia's independence.

== Exhibitions ==
Among the events at which it was shown are:

- 28th Guarnicê Film Festival - São Luís - Maranhão 2005
- 2nd Campo Grande Film Festival
- Northeast Exhibition - Natal-Rio Grande do Norte 2005
- 1st Belém Festival of Brazilian Cinema - 2005
- 8th FCVDC - Curitiba Film, Video and D-cine Festival - 2004
- 32nd FICA - Algarve International Film Festival 2004
- 12th Teresina-Piauí Festival 2004

== Awards ==
- 2005 - Best Art Direction, at the 28th Guarnicê Film Festival
- 2004 - 3rd Place, at the 12th Teresina-Piauí Festival
