= Pirajá, Salvador =

Pirajá
- Neighborhood
- Interactive map of Pirajá
- Country: Brazil
- State: Bahia
- Municipality: Salvador

Population
  - Total: 30,641

Pirajá (pronounced [piɾaˈʒa]) is a neighborhood in the municipality of Salvador, in the state of Bahia, Brazil. It is home to several several residencial complexes, a bus and coach station, a subway station (Pirajá Station), a dry port, the Cobre Dam and São Bartolomeu Park. It is also the headquarters of "Cortejo Afro", an association dedicated to Afro-Brazilian culture, referenced by singer Daniela Mercury in her song "Preta."

== Etymology ==
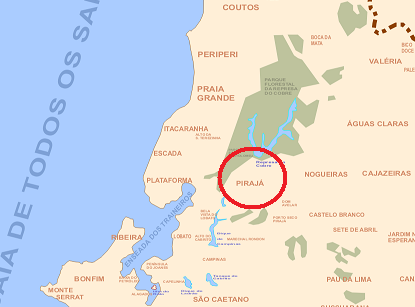
Location of Pirajá on a map

"Pirajá" is a term of Tupi origin meaning "place full of fish", derived from the words pirá ("fish") and îá ("full").

== History ==
The Battle of Pirajá is considered one of the major battles fought in the Cabrito-Campinas-Pirajá area. The main battle for independence, in which the people of Bahia defeated the Portuguese forces in 1823, took place in the Pantheon of Pirajá, located in Largo de Pirajá. Every July 1st, the place hosts the arrival of the Symbolic Flame from the Recôncavo, representing the revolutionary villages established in the region. In the main square of the neighborhood, Pierre Labatut, the French general who fought in the Battle of Pirajá, is buried in the local pantheon.

The neighborhood is one of the oldest in Salvador and developed around sugar mills and early Jesuit missions established in Bahia during the colonial period. According to Professor Luís Henrique Dias Tavares: "In the Ribeira de Pirajá, the Jesuits established the village of São João de Plataforma in the early years of colonization, beginning the first experiences of catechesis. There, the first sugar mills in the city emerged, such as El-Rei or Pirajá.

In the São João sugar mill, which belonged to the Society of Jesus, Father António Vieira preached his first sermon in 1633. One of the oldest routes to the interior of the country, Estrada das Boiadas, ran through the hills of Pirajá. On the other hand, Enseada do Cabrito offered the only truly safe shelter for ships in the vicinity of the city."

== Location ==
The neighborhood of Pirajá is located along BR-324 and near Salvador's Railway Suburb region. It can be accessed via BR-324 (from the north and east), DERBA Road (from the north), Estrada Velha de Campinas (from the south), and the Pirajá–Suburbana connection (from the west).

Pirajá has limited road and public transport connections to the Railway Suburb region and to neighboring areas located across the Cobre Dam, such as Rio Sena, Alto da Terezinha, and Ilha Amarela.

== Labatut Festival ==
The Labatut Festival was established in 1853, four years after the death of General Pierre Labatut. A pilgrimage to his tomb began at that time, and he continues to be revered as one of the leading figures in the Independence of Bahia.

The festival takes place a week after the July 2 Independence Day celebrations. On this occasion, residents of Pirajá and neighboring areas organize a three-day celebration of their own.

== 8 de Novembro Street ==
Pirajá's busiest commercial street, 8 de Novembro, is named after the date of the Battle of Pirajá. The conflict began in the early hours of 8 November 1822, when Portuguese troops landed in Itacaranha and advanced toward Engenho do Cabrito and Pirajá.

General Pierre Labatut, a French officer in Brazilian service, reinforced the Brazilian forces with a brigade of approximately 1,300 soldiers from Pernambuco, Bahia, and Rio de Janeiro under Major José de Barros Falcão de Lacerda. The Brazilian troops repelled three Portuguese assaults, inflicting significant casualties.

An oft-cited anecdote about the battle, mentioned by Tobias Monteiro in The Elaboration of Independence, recounts that after a Brazilian officer reportedly ordered a retreat, bugler Luís Lopes instead sounded a charge call. Although Brazilian cavalry was not present, the signal allegedly caused confusion among the Portuguese forces, contributing to their withdrawal and securing Brazilian victory.

== Demography ==
In 2012, Pirajá was listed as one of the most dangerous neighborhoods in Salvador, according to data from the Brazilian Institute of Geography and Statistics (IBGE) and the Public Security Secretariat (SSP), published in a neighborhood-level violence map by the newspaper Correio.

The area ranked among the most violent due to its annual homicide rate per 100,000 inhabitants, which fell within the "61–90" category on the index, placing it among the highest levels recorded in the city.

== See also ==
- Battle of Pirajá
