= Presciliano Silva =

Brazilian painter (1883–1965)

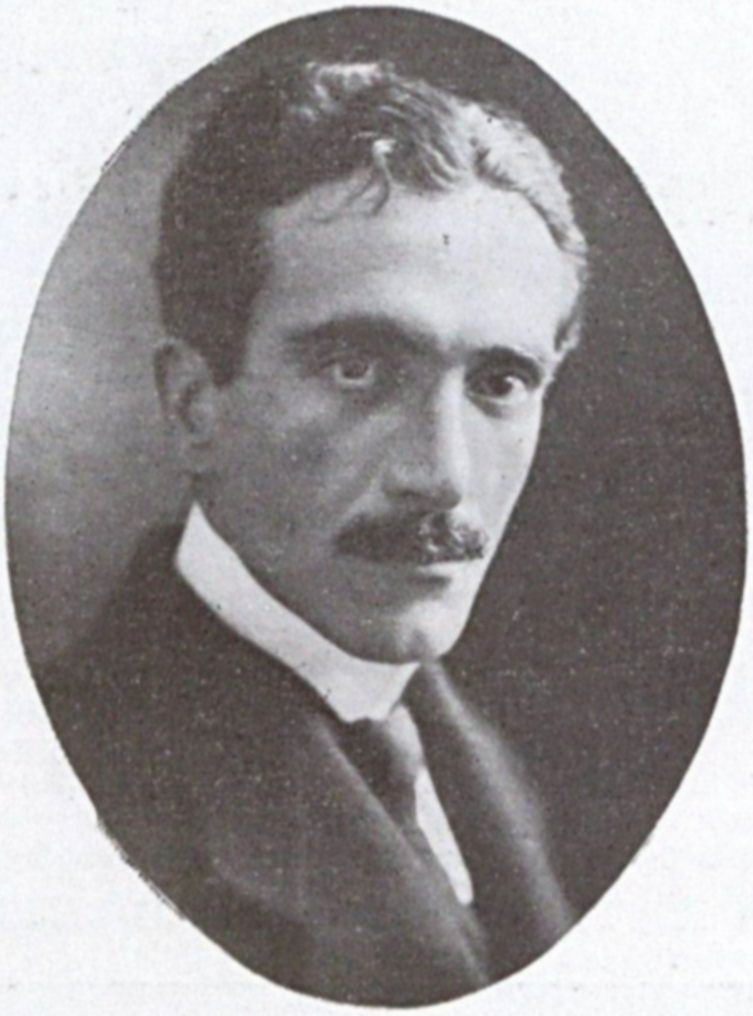
- Presciliano Silva, in a photo from Bahia Illustrada magazine (1918).
- Born: May 17, 1883; Salvador, Bahia
- Died: August 7, 1965 (aged 82); Rio de Janeiro
- Notable work: Entrada do Exército Libertador

Presciliano Athanagildo Izidoro Rodrigues da Silva, (Note: His name can also be spelled as Prisciliano Atanagildo Isidoro Rodrigues da Silva, according to the new spelling reform in the Portuguese language.) better known as Presciliano Silva (Salvador, May 17, 1883 — Rio de Janeiro, August 7, 1965) was a Brazilian painter. Some of his works are exhibited at the Bahia Museum of Art.

== Biography ==
Presciliano was the first son of the second marriage of Possidônio Izidoro da Silva and Clotilde Rodrigues da Silva, who was his supporter; his mother enrolled him, at the age of 13, in the School of Fine Arts and since then he has attended private classes at the Liceu de Artes e Ofícios, with professor Manoel Lopes Rodrigues.

The professor supported his trip to Paris in 1903, where he faced prejudice and experienced the suffering caused by noise and deafness from sclerosis of the eardrums. He remained in France until 1906, when he returned to Bahia and received a favorable response to his work. Encouraged by friends like Olegário Mariano, this motivated him to exhibit in Rio de Janeiro.

In 1912, he overcame the resistance and managed to exhibit his painting of Mme. Le Clinche at the Official Salon in Paris. With the outbreak of World War I, he returned to his hometown, where he established his studio the following year.

In the city, he taught at the Federal Institute of Bahia. In 1920, he received the words from Ruy Barbosa: "...my instinct, my intuition, some taste I may have, perhaps, and my habit of seeing works by masters, point to Presciliano Silva as a painter of extraordinary merit and future."

In 1928, he joined the Bahia School of Fine Arts as a teacher, where he would later become director and professor emeritus. He was the mentor of another name in Brazilian painting: José Lima, the "Painter of Churches."

In 1930, he created his best known work, a depiction of July 2, 1823, the date marking the end of the war for the Independence of Bahia, entitled Entrada do Exército Libertador (English: Entry of the Liberation Army).

The artist continued painting until his death in 1965, and his work was recognized by numerous exhibitions and awards. He was married to Alice Moniz Silva, with whom he had an only daughter, Maria da Conceição.

== See also ==
- Entrada do Exército Libertador
