= 1798 Revolt of the Alfaiates =

Slave revolt in Bahia, Brazil

Flag of the Revolt of the Tailors. Bahia, 1798.

The Bahian Conspiracy (Portuguese: Conjuração Baiana), also known as Revolt of the Tailors–after the trade of many of the leaders–and recently also called Revolt of Buzios, was a late eighteenth century slave rebellion in the then Captaincy of Bahia, in the State of Brazil. Unlike the Inconfidência Mineira of 1789, it was a separatist movement with a popular base and extensive black participation.

The objectives of the rebelling baianos were, according to Clóvis Moura, "much more radical," and the proposal to liberate the slaves was one of the main goals. Its leaders and members included "freed blacks, black slaves, pardo slaves, freed pardos, artisans, tailors; those who were from the most oppressed or discriminated classes of Bahia colonial society". With many slaves living in Bahia, the probability of revolts and rebellions ran high. The elites of the area were frightened that if rebellion or revolts did happen, they would be similar to the Haitian Revolution. Because of the significant participation of Bahia's lower classes, the revolt has also been called “The First Brazilian Social Revolution”.

== Background ==
The revolt's beginnings were established in the city of Salvador by a group of disenfranchised workers seeking to initiate an uprising against Portuguese authority. These marginalized groups resented the Portuguese “for their domination of the country, as well as the apparent wealth that had been accumulated by a handful of free Brazilians”. This revolt was influenced by principles of the Enlightenment and the successful independence movements that resulted. To add to the narrative of civil discontent were the various accusations of corruption and wrongdoing made toward the Relação, Salvador's High Court, which Portuguese authorities failed to properly investigate. It was during this period characterized by internal and external conflict that a conspiracy of rebellion developed. Current evidence suggests that the initial plot began through conversation in 1797 between Francisco Moniz Barreto, Lucas Dantas d'Amorim Tôrres, and Manuel de Santa Anna. The ideology of the rebellion spread via a forty-four line poem authored by Barreto.

On August 12, 1798 a proclamation was posted to a church door in Salvador, Bahia that read: “Be encouraged People of Bahia because the time of our Liberty is approaching. The time when all will be brothers. The time when all will be equal.” It was this written proclamation with no identified author that brought the conspiracy to the attention of Bahia's authorities.

The conspiracy, largely inspired by the events of the French Revolution, had three specific demands: “full independence, the creation of a republic, racial equality, and the complete abolition of slavery”. The revolt included members of many different racial backgrounds. Poor whites, freed-men, slaves, interracial artisans, and radical members of the upper class were among those who joined in the uprising. Lucas Dantas do Amorim Tôrres, a mulatto soldier who was captured and tried for his involvement in the revolt, is quoted explaining to the judges during his trial: "We want a republic in order to breathe freely because we live subjugated and because we're colored and we can't advance and if there was a republic there would be equality for everyone." These demands for equality threatened to undermine Brazil's race-based hierarchy for political and social privileges and were swiftly repressed by crown authorities.

At the onset of the revolt in 1798, there was no organized plan of action. According to Manuel Faustino dos Santos Lira, one of the revolt's coconspirators, the goal was to convince the governor to become the president of the new republic through means of minimal violence.

The 1798 Revolt of the Tailors was appropriately named due to the participation of tailors as well as other members of Bahia's skilled workers such as “soldiers, artisans, [and] carpenters”. Most of the rebels were not slaves but free mulattoes who lived in extreme poverty.

== Main actors ==
The four identified leaders of the revolt were Luís Gonzaga dos Virgens, a soldier, João de Deus do Nascimento, a tailor, Lucas Dantas d’Amorim Torres, a soldier, and Manuel Faustino dos Santos Lira, a tailor. All four were mulattoes and poor. There was a second group (white and of high social status) that authorities did not prosecute, and they were Cipriano Barata de Almeida, Francisco Moniz Barreto d’Aragão, and Lieutenants Hermogenes Francisco d’Aguilar and José Gomes de Oliveira Borges. Lieutenant d’Aguilar, Luís Gonzaga and Lucas Dantas were known to have actively attempted to destabilize the military by recruiting members to the revolutionary movement. These efforts were met with some success. Borges and d’Aguilar were assigned to guard M. Larcher, who was a Frenchman allowed to stay in Salvador as long as he agreed to be under military watch. Larcher inspired both d’Aguilar and Borges and their political views. Larcher was the founder of the Knights of Light, a prominent masonic society that was formally established on July 14, 1797. Most of the original propaganda spread from this organization. The full involvement of the Knights of Light cannot be completely traced, though. It is vague in some spots, and has completely disappeared in others.

On the 8 of November 1799, the government proceeded to the execution of those sentenced for the beginning of the revolt to capital punishment by hanging, in the following order: soldier Lucas Dantas Amorim Torres, an apprentice tailor Manuel Faustino dos Santos Lira, soldier Luís Gonzaga dos Virgens and master tailor João de Deus Nascimento.

=== Luís Gonzaga dos Virgens ===
Luís Gonzaga dos Virgens was a soldier and a leader of the rebellion. He was arrested on August 22 for the spreading of propaganda. When he got to prison, he did not confess, but he did say that “the propaganda was an excellent way to initiate the projected revolution because in this way the people would be encouraged and they would become accustomed little by little to the ideas of liberty and independence”. He was part of the five men sentenced to death after the failure of the revolt. The fifth is not included in this list, as his sentence was later reduced due to him not being as prominent a member of the revolt as the rest.

=== João de Deus do Nascimento ===
João de Deus do Nascimento was a tailor and a leader of the rebellion. He was a strong advocate for free trade, and was against the high taxes and various tributes that the Portugal government had imposed. He was sentenced to death after the failure of the revolt.

=== Lucas Dantas d’Amorim Torres ===
Lucas Dantas d’Amorim Torres was a soldier and a leader of the rebellion. The meetings to plan for the revolution were usually held at his home, since he was the leader by practicality. He was active within his regiment, constantly spreading propaganda. He was actively, yet quietly, trying to destabilize the military. He was also sentenced to death after the failure of the revolt; he refused his last rites.

=== Manuel Faustino dos Santos Lira ===
Manuel Faustino dos Santos Lira was a tailor and a leader of the rebellion. He was a critic of the church, due to them defending slavery. He was the third to be sentenced to death after the revolt, and refused his last rites.

=== Cipriano Barata de Almeida ===
Cipriano Barata de Almeida was a surgeon that graduated from the University of Coimbra; he was a member of the Knights of Light, and spread propaganda throughout the lower classes, despite his own status. For some reason, he tried and was able to convince two people to give up on the conspiracy. He was acquitted after the failure of the revolt, due to his influence in the community.

=== Francisco Moniz Barreto d’Aragão ===
Francisco Moniz Barreto d’Aragão was a teacher; he was a member of the Knights of Light. He wrote poems supporting the ideologies of independence, equality, liberty, and the importance of reason. He was not in Salvador during the end of the revolt, and therefore did not face any punishment.

=== Hermogenes Francisco d’Aguilar ===
Hermogenes Francisco d’Aguilar was a Lieutenant in the army, and was assigned to guard M. Larcher. He was a member of the Knights of Light. Along with Torres, he was trying to destabilize the military. He was sentenced to one year in prison after the failure of the revolt.

== Outcomes of the revolt ==
It took less than two weeks for authorities to apprehend and charge forty people tied to the revolt. Out of these forty, thirty-six were brought to trial. Of these there was one university graduate, one of noble heritage, two junior officers in the army, eight military men, and the remainder self-employed artisans including ten tailors. Twenty-four of the forty seized were of mulatto heritage and “almost all were native-born Brazilians”. Those tried were charged with conspiring against the Crown, pillaging, and planning to murder government officials. Seventeen of the accused were absolved, four were given prison sentences, eight were exiled to Africa, two slaves involved were sold and discharged from the military, and five were sentenced to death. On November 8, 1799, four leaders of the conspiracy were publicly hanged.

"The plot and resultant repression demonstrates the divergent goals that previously silent social groups were bringing to the foreground, and the importance of class position in determining the depth of commitment of individual insurgents."
