= Queimado Fountain =

Fountain in Salvador, Bahia, Brazil

- Fonte do Queimado
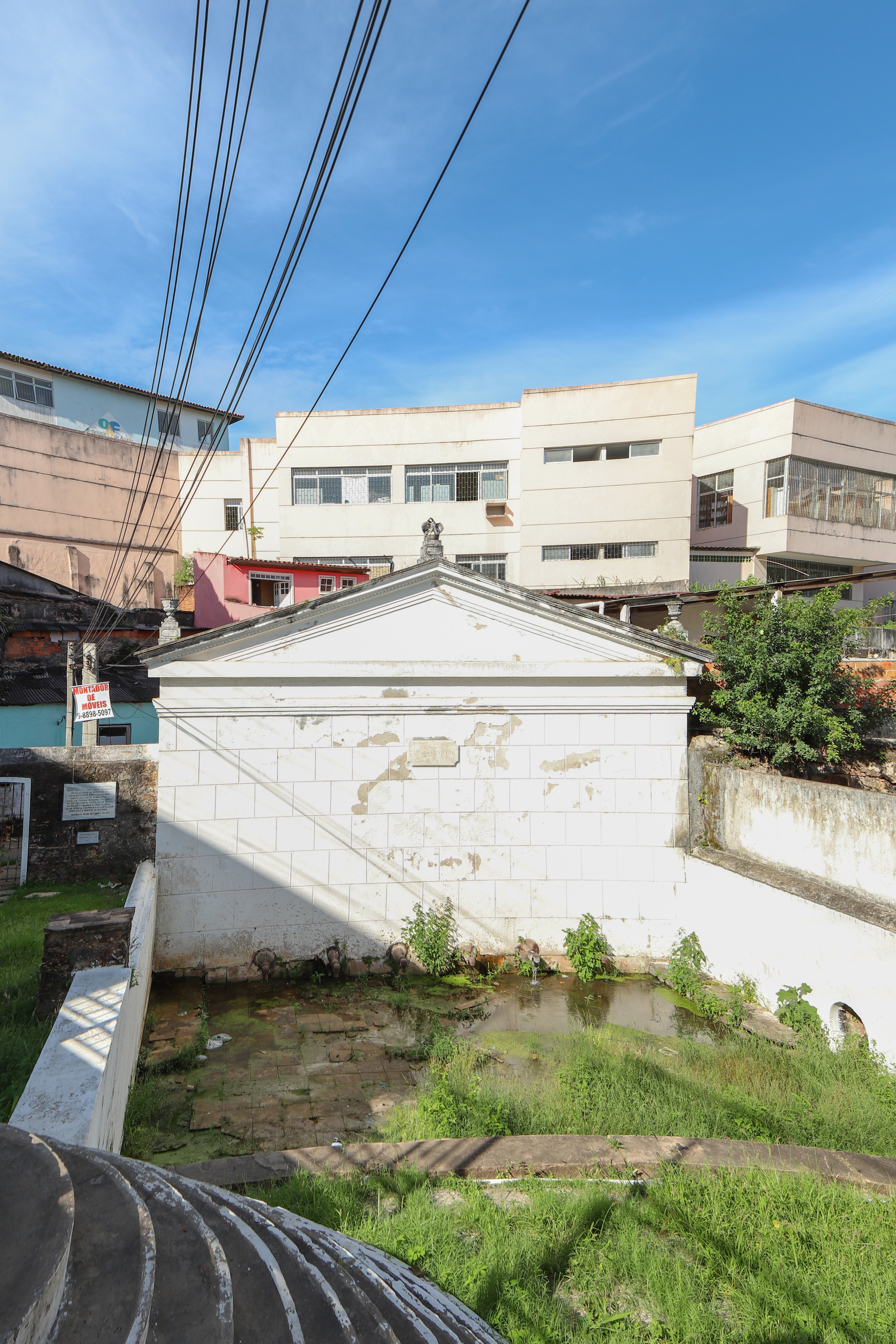
- Queimado Fountain, Salvador, Bahia

- Location within Brazil

General information
- Location: Largo do Queimado, Salvador, Bahia, Brazil
- Coordinates: 12.956263°S 38.497658°W

The Queimado Fountain (Portuguese: Fonte do Queimado) is an abandoned fountain in Salvador, Bahia, Brazil. The fountain is located at the Largo do Queimado, a broad public square, below the Church and Convent of Our Lady of Solitude. The fountain likely dates to the early 19th century and is one of a series of fountains built along the escarpment of the historical center of Salvador. It consists of a broad brick area and glazed tile facade with a triangular pediment. The fountain was listed as a historic structure by the Artistic and Cultural Heritage Institute of Bahia (Instituto do Patrimônio Artístico Cultural da Bahia, IPAC) in 1984.

== History ==
The date of construction of the fountain is around 1801. It is one of a system of fountains built across the escarpment of the historical center of Salvador. Few homes in Salvador had private water facilities; entire neighborhoods relied on a single fountain. Alberto Heráclito Ferreira Filho described the public fountains of the colonial period as "noisy places frequented hundreds of people, with the water-bearers, the washerwomen, and their young children." Domingos Rabelo described the fountain on a report of the parish of Santo Antonio Alem do Carmo in 1829. Dom Pedro II and the Empress visited the fountain in 1859. The Companhia do Queimado, a utility company and dam created by the state of Bahia in the mid-19th century, is unrelated to the fountain.

The fountain was restored in 1992 under the direction of the architect Paulo Ormindo de Azevedo.

== Structure ==
The Queimado Fountain has a simple façade of white rectangular tiles with a triangular pediment. A stone pinnacle with the figure of a pelican is located above the pediment, and stone urns to the left and right. A plaque reading "Quemado, Camara Municipal, 1838" is placed at center. The fountain is accessed by stone steps and surrounded by an iron fence, both dating to the 20th century. Plaques referring to restoration of the fountain were placed on a wall to the left of the fountain.

== Access and condition ==
The Queimado Fountain is accessible from the Largo do Queimado below the Church and Convent of Our Lady of Solitude. It is in poor condition and lacks security. The fountain is used as a source of water for a carwash and the site is frequented by drug users.

== Protected status ==
The Queimado Fountain was listed as a historic structure by the State of Bahia via the National Institute of Historic and Artistic Heritage in 1984 under decree number 30.483/84.
