= Siege of Salvador (1822–1823) =

Conflict during the Brazilian War of Independence

- Part of the Brazilian War of Independence
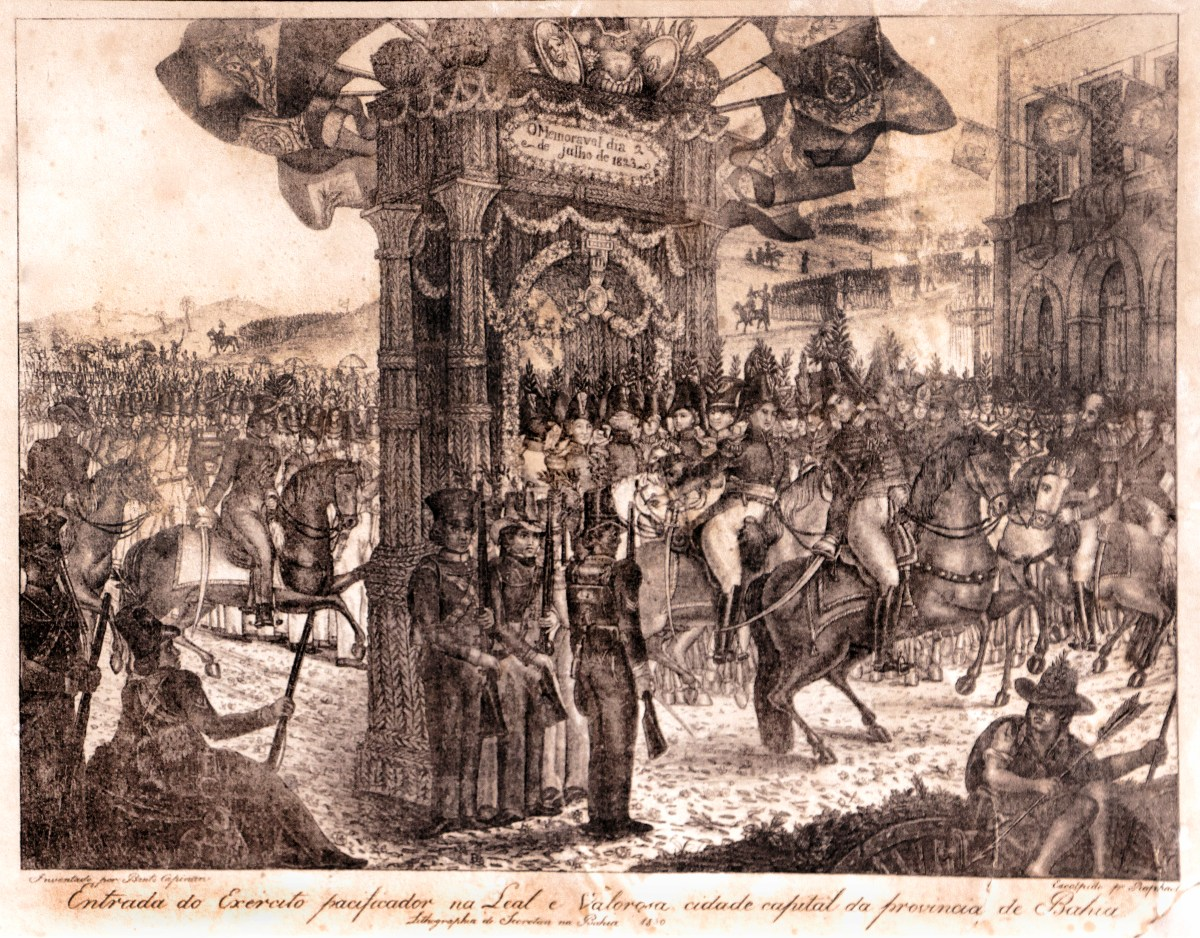
- Entrada do Exército pacificador na Leal e Valorosa cidade capital da província de Bahia, lithograph by Bento Capinam, c. 1830. It depicts the triumphal entry of the Brazilian army into the capital of the province of Bahia
Date	2 March 1822 – 2 July 1823
Location	Salvador, Bahia, Brazil 12°58′29″S 38°28′36″W
Result	Brazilian victory

Belligerents
Empire of Brazil	Kingdom of Portugal

Commanders and leaders
Pierre Labatut; Lima e Silva	Madeira de Melo

Strength
At the beginning: 1,500; At the end: 14,000; Ships: 1 ship of the line 3 frigates 2 corvettes 3 brigs 1 charrua 1 brig-schooner	At the beginning: 3,000; At the end: 10,500; Ships: 1 ship of the line 2 frigates 8 corvettes 2 brigs 1 charrua 1 smack

Casualties and losses
750 killed 280 wounded	2,500 killed 700 wounded 300 captured

The siege of Salvador occurred during the Brazilian War of Independence, during which the newly formed Brazilian army, under the command of French general Pierre Labatut, attempted to capture the city of Salvador in Bahia from its Portuguese defenders. The siege lasted from 2 March 1822 until 2 July 1823, finally ending when the Portuguese commander, Madeira de Melo, surrendered his forces to the Brazilians.

Madeira de Melo's proclamation to the inhabitants of Bahia one week before the siege, 21 February 1822
