= Battle of Pirajá =

Battle of the Brazilian War of Independence

- Part of the Brazilian War of Independence
Date	November 8, 1822
Location	Piraja, Bahia, Brazil
Result	Brazilian victory

Belligerents
Empire of Brazil	Kingdom of Portugal

Commanders and leaders
Pierre Labatut	Madeira de Melo

Strength
1,300–2,000	1,900

The Battle of Pirajá (Portuguese: Batalha de Pirajá) was fought as part of the Independence of Bahia and more broadly, as part of the Brazilian War of Independence. It was fought in Pirajá, now a neighborhood of the city of Salvador, Bahia on November 8, 1822. The Battle of Pirajá was the largest engagement in the fight for the independence of Bahia, involving approximately 10,000 troops.

== Prelude ==
In command of the Portuguese forces in Bahia was Inácio Luís Madeira de Melo, who had been sent by Portugal to quell rumors of independence and political and administrative dissent. The French general Pierre Labatut, who had been appointed by the Prince Regent, Pedro I of Brazil, on July 3, 1822, as commander of the Peacemaker Army, took command of the Brazilian forces against Madeira de Melo. Labatut established his headquarters at Engenho Novo, a sugarcane plantation in the Bahian Recôncavo in the interior of the state. Labatut placed Colonel Gomes Caldeira and his brigade in Itapoã, now a neighborhood in the east of the city of Salvador. Major (later colonel) José de Barros Falcão de Lacerda was placed in Pirajá, a neighborhood approximately 15 miles (24 km) north of the historic center of Salvador. There were also detachments in Engenho Cabrito, Coqueiro, Bate-Folha and other points. On the morning of the 8th, almost all the positions of Brazilians were attacked or threatened, either by land or by sea.

== Battle ==
Tobias Monteiro, in his A elaboração da Independência, records that a Major Barros Falcão, who led the Brazilian troops at one point, had ordered a retreat, but bugler Luis Lopes instead sounded the "cavalry, advance and behead". Such a move would have been impossible, since there was no Brazilian cavalry in the battle, but the Portuguese panicked and retreated to the historic center of the city, giving the advantage to the Brazilian troops, who attacked with renewed enthusiasm and won the battle. In total, the battle lasted ten hours. Statistics on the number of casualties in the battle, however, vary greatly according to sources, both in Brazil and Portugal. Labatut recorded 200 dead on November 8, but 633 in a document of the following day. The newspaper O Espelho in Rio de Janeiro recorded 375 dead and 221 wounded Portuguese. Other sources record 30, 64, 70, or 80 Portuguese deaths.

== Outcome and aftermath ==
The battle was a decisive engagement between the Peacemaker Army and the Portuguese Legião Constitucional. The Brazilian victory consolidated the political and military defeat of the Portuguese in Bahia. Such factors would contribute to the independence of Bahia instigated on July 2, 1823, regarded by many researchers and commentators as a framework for the effective and practical independence of Brazil. The battle formed a central element of the celebration of Dois de Julho, or 2nd of July, a commemoration of the independence of the Bahia.

== Bibliography ==
- Garcia, Rodolfo (2012). Obras do Barão do Rio Branco VI: efemérides brasileiras (in Portuguese). Brasília: Fundação Alexandre de Gusmão. ISBN 978-85-7631-357-1.
- Almeida, Miguel Calmon du Pin (1923). A batalha de Pirajá (PDF) (in Portuguese). Rio de Janeiro: Imprensa Nacional.
