= Graça (neighborhood) =

Coordinates: 12.9990°S 38.5236°W

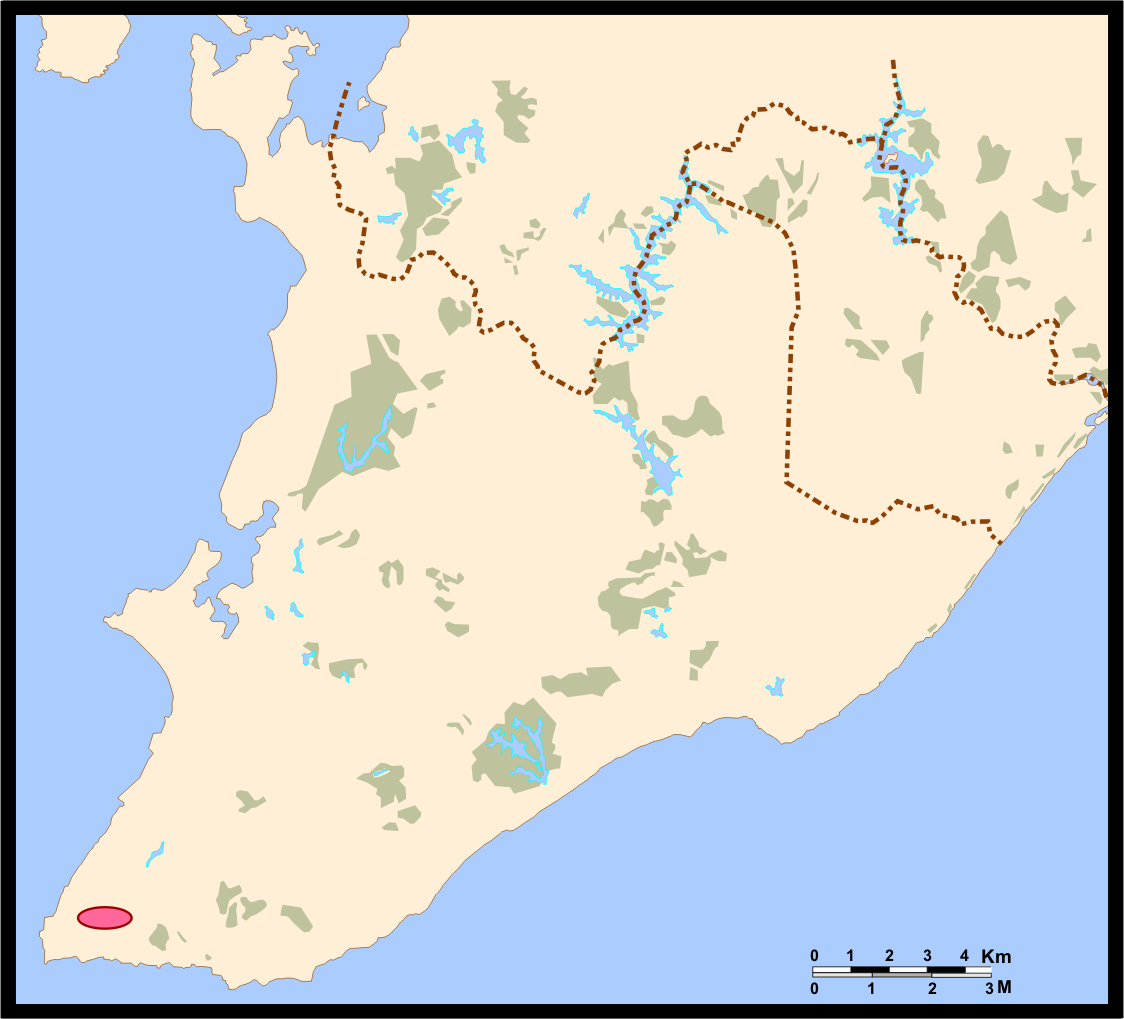
Location of Graça.

Graça is a neighborhood located in the southern zone of Salvador, Bahia. It is one of the oldest neighborhoods in Salvador.

The Church and Monastery of Our Lady of Grace is located in Graça.
