= Cipriano Barata =

Brazilian physician and politician

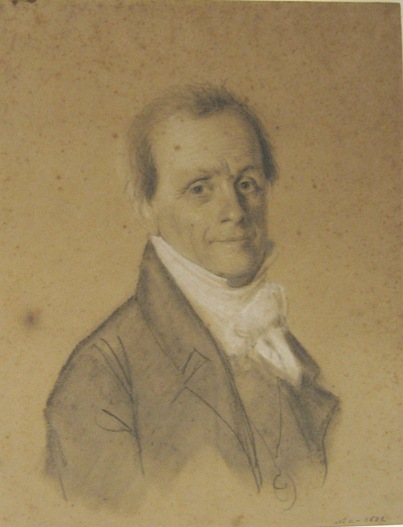
- Portrait by Domingos Sequeira, c. 1821–22
- Born: 26 September 1762; Salvador, Captaincy of Bahia, Colonial Brazil
- Died: 7 June 1838 (aged 75); Natal, Empire of Brazil

Cipriano José Barata de Almeida (26 September 1762 – 7 June 1838) was a Brazilian medical doctor and politician who was in favor of Brazilian independence. He was a founding member of the Masonic lodge "Knights of the Light". He was also a journalist who started a newspaper in Portugal called the Sentinel of Liberty.

== Early life and education ==
Barata was born in Bahia, Brazil in 1762. Barata graduated from the University of Coimbra, where he studied surgery, philosophy and mathematics and was introduced to Enlightenment ideas that were popular in academia at the time.

== Career and political activity ==
Together with professor Francisco Muniz Barreto and others, he was a member of the first Masonic lodge in Brazil, the "Knights of the Light", founded in Salvador in 1797. The following year, he attended the casting Bahia, being held by legal authorities afterward. Some say that he was the editor of the Manifesto to the People from Bahia, which urged the people to revolt. He gained prominence as a member of a movement, Conjuração Baiana, that wanted independence for Brazil and the end of slavery. In 1800, he was arrested and released for his alleged involvement. After this point, he became a sugarcane farmer in the town of Abrantes (current Camaçari) and continued practicing as a doctor.

Barata fled to Portugal in 1832. Shortly after his arrival he started a newspaper called Sentinela da Liberdade (Sentinel of Liberty).
