= Church and Convent of Our Lady of Solitude =

Church and convent in Salvador, Brazil

- Igreja e Convento de Nossa Senhora da Soledade
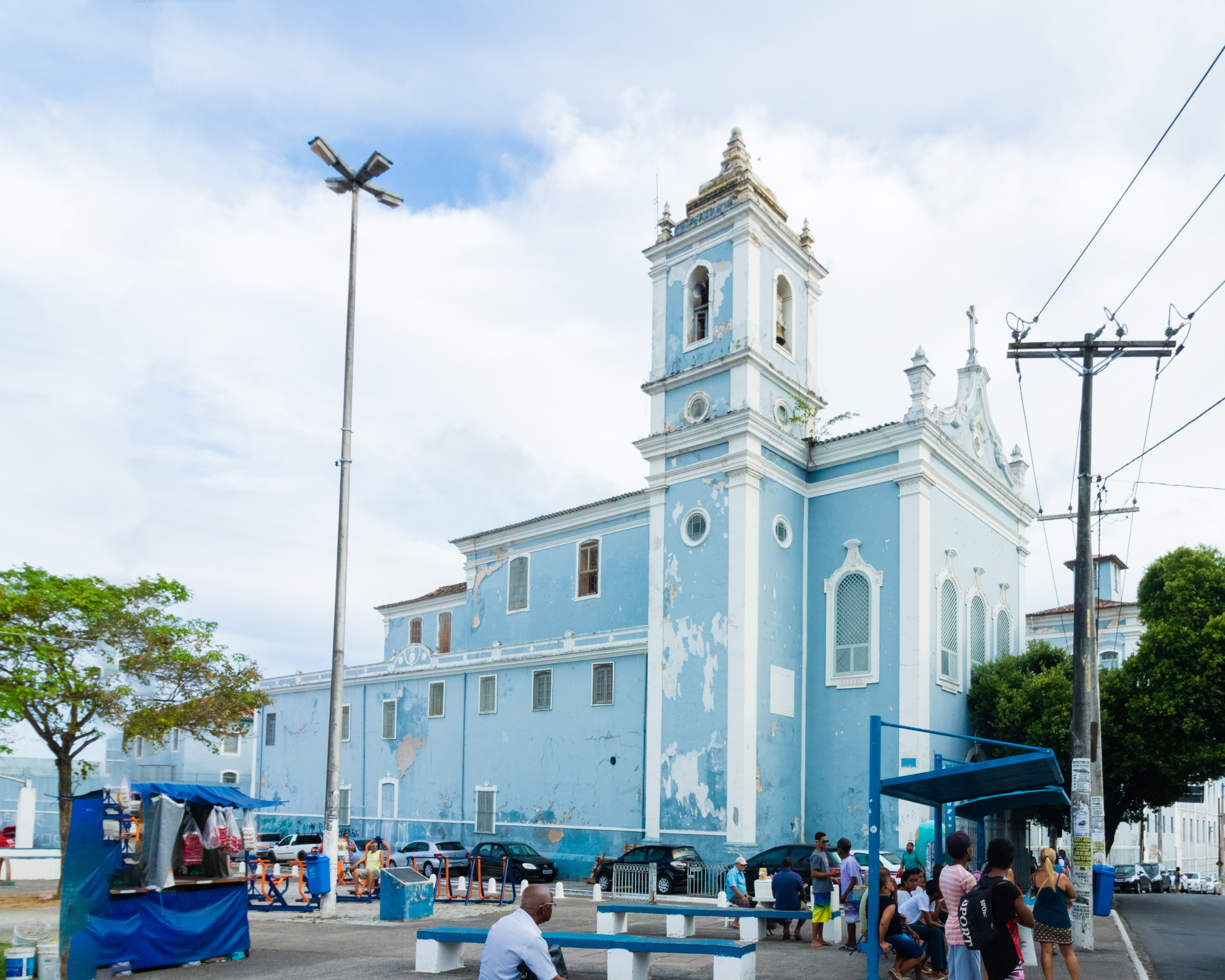
- Church and Convent of Our Lady of Solitude, Salvador, Bahia, Brazil

- Location of the Church and Convent of Our Lady of Solitude in Brazil Church and Convent of Our Lady of Solitude (South America)

Religion
- Affiliation: Catholic
- Rite: Roman

Location
- Municipality: Salvador
- State: Bahia
- Country: Brazil
- Interactive map of Church and Convent of Our Lady of Solitude
- Coordinates: 12.957867°S 38.499318°W

Architecture
- Established: 1738
- Direction of façade: West

National Historic Heritage of Brazil
- Designated: 1938
- Reference no.: 90

The Church and Convent of Our Lady of Solitude (Portuguese: Igreja e Convento de Nossa Senhora da Soledade) is an 18th-century Roman Catholic church and former convent in Salvador, Bahia, Brazil. The church and convent were founded in 1736 and are dedicated to Our Lady of Solitude. The convent has functioned as a school since 1927. The Church and Convent of Our Lady of Solitude is located within the Protected Historic District of Soledade (Área de Proteção Contígua--Soledade) by the State of Bahia.

== History ==
Gabriel Malagrida, an Italian Jesuit priest, arrived in Bahia in 1736. Malagrida was granted land by José Fialho, Archbishop of Bahia, and Luís Peregrino de Ataíde, the 10th Count of Atouguia, previously owned by a hermitage dedicated to Our Lady of Solitude. Little is known about the early hermitage, other than that it was located near the Queimado Fountain, a reliable source of water. Malagrida was associated with the Company of St. Ursula and south to establish a recolhimento, or center, for girls who sought to enter religious life. A convent was built with a rooms around a large cloister. A church was built at the same time. The convent was converted into a school in 1927.

== Location ==
The Church and Convent of Our Lady of Solitude is located in the Soledade district north of the Historic Center of Salvador. It sits on Ladeira da Soledade, a street which originally connected Soledade to the historic center of Salvador. The Ladeira da Soledade was "a suburb where there was little more than a convent, some plantations and a fine view over the bay" in the colonial period. It is now home to numerous colonial-period solares, or manor homes, notably Solar Bandeira, constructed below the church and convent in the late 18th century.

== Structure ==
The Church and Convent of Our Lady of Solitude consists of a church with a rectangular nave, small sacristy, and library; a convent with a large cloister, basement and two floors above ground level; and a three-story belvedere with a view over the Bay of All Saints. The Convent of Solitude is one of three convents with a three-story belvedere in Salvador, the others being at the convents of Desterro and Lapa.

== Protected status ==
The Church and Convent of Our Lady of Solitude is located within the Protected Historic District of Soledade (Área de Proteção Contígua--Soledade) by the State of Bahia. The protected district was established in 1983.

== Access ==
The Church and Convent of Our Lady of Solitude functions as a school and may not be visited.
