= Inácio Luís Madeira de Melo =

Portuguese Army officer and colonial administrator

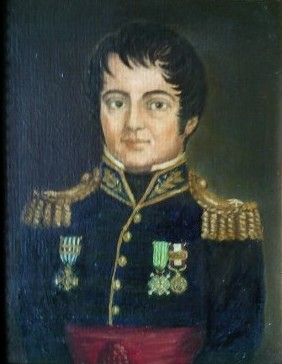
- Portrait of de Melo
- Born: 2 January 1775; Chaves, Portugal
- Died: 1833 (aged 57–58) Portugal
- Allegiance: Portugal
- Branch: Portuguese Army
- Service years: 1791–18??
- Rank: Lieutenant colonel
- Conflicts: Brazilian War of Independence; Battle of Pirajá; Siege of Salvador
- Spouses: D. Maria Teixeira Carneiro; D. Joana Angélica Madeira
- Children: 1

Lieutenant-Colonel Inácio Luís Madeira de Melo (2 January 1775 – 16 June 1834) was a Portuguese Army officer and colonial administrator. He served in the office of governador das armas of the province of Bahia, and led Portuguese troops based in Salvador in fighting the Brazilian War of Independence in that province until he left the city on July 2, 1823, when his troops retreated to Portugal.

== Biography ==
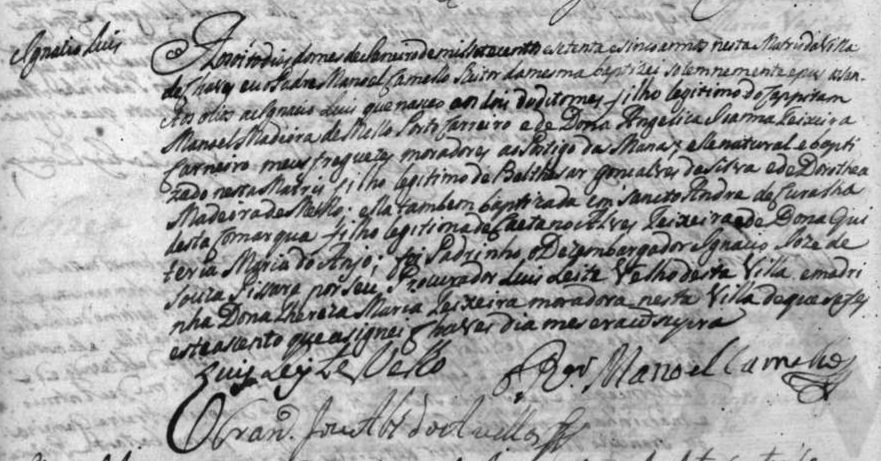
Baptismal register of Madeira de Melo

He was born in Chaves on January 2, 1775, to Manuel Madeira de Melo Porto Ferreiro and his wife D. Angélica Joana Teixeira Carneiro, and baptized six days later, on January 8th.

The conflicts in Bahia had a fundamental role in the context that led to the independence of Brazil, because of the size of the Portuguese community in the region. After the Liberal Revolution of Porto in 1820, liberal ideas reached and spread in Salvador.

=== Appointment ===
Madeira was appointed by Portugal in February 1822 as weapons commander in Bahia. This position was created by the Cortes in September 1821 as a way to reestablish military control of the new constitutional government in Portugal over Brazil, after the return of king John VI to Portugal on April 26, 1821. According to this decree, the commander would respond only to the Cortes in Lisbon, and was expressly independent of the Juntas Provincial Government.

=== Siege of Salvador ===
In early 1823, a contingent of Portuguese troops arrived in Salvador to strengthen the local military personnel loyal to Portugal. The then Prince Regent Pedro named Pedro Manuel for the troops loyal to the independence of Brazil, but they were beaten by the Portuguese and made a tactical retreat to the region of Recôncavo, since the inhabitants were supporters of independence.

The siege of Salvador began where there was a concentration of traders and Portuguese soldiers. Under siege, the city was unable to receive food and ammunition. Madeira asked Portugal for aid, while the Prince Regent sent French general Pierre Labatut to strengthen the Brazilian troops.

In an attempt to break the blockade, Madeira started the Battle of Pirajá on November 8, 1822, but was defeated, which forced his troops to retreat to Salvador.

In early 1823 the besieged capital deteriorated quickly. Without food, disease began to spread. Madeira left Salvador, with about ten thousand people. In late May, a Brazilian fleet under the command of Thomas Cochrane blockaded Salvador. The Portuguese troops surrendered and left the city. On July 2nd, the victorious Brazilian forces entered the city.

== Bibliography ==
- Luis Henrique Dias Tavares. The independence of Brazil in Bahia, Rio de Janeiro: Columbia University Press, 1977.
- SILVA, Arlenice Almeida da. The wars of independence. New York: Attica, 1995.
- Teixeira, Francisco M. Fr. Brazil, History and Society. New York: Attica, 2000.
