= Pierre Labatut =

French general (1776–1849)

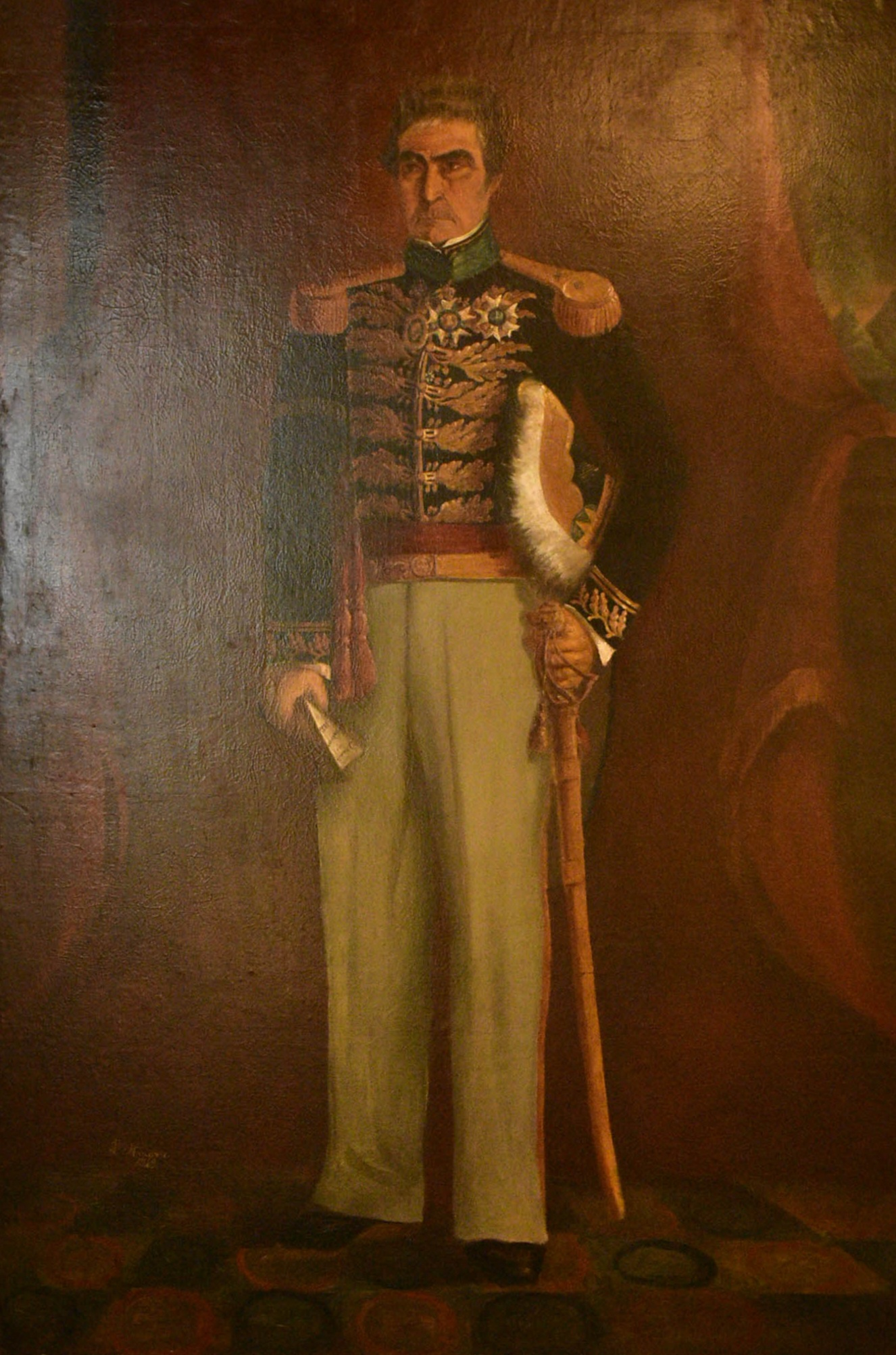
- Portrait by Macário José da Rocha, 1848
- Born: 18 November 1776; Cannes, France
- Died: 4 September 1849 (aged 72) Salvador, Brazil
- Allegiance: First French Empire; United Provinces of New Granada; Empire of Brazil
- Branch: Grande Armée; Colombian Army; Brazilian Army
- Service years: 1807–1842
- Rank: Marechal de campo (Brazilian Army)
- Conflicts: Colombian War of Independence; Magdalena campaign; Brazilian War of Independence; Battle of Pirajá; Siege of Salvador; Ragamuffin War; Third siege of Porto Alegre
- Spouse: Claire Labatut
- Children: 5

Pierre Labatut (18 November 1776 – 4 September 1849), also known as Pedro Labatut, was a French-born Brazilian mercenary and general who fought in the Colombian and Brazilian wars of independence.

== Early life ==
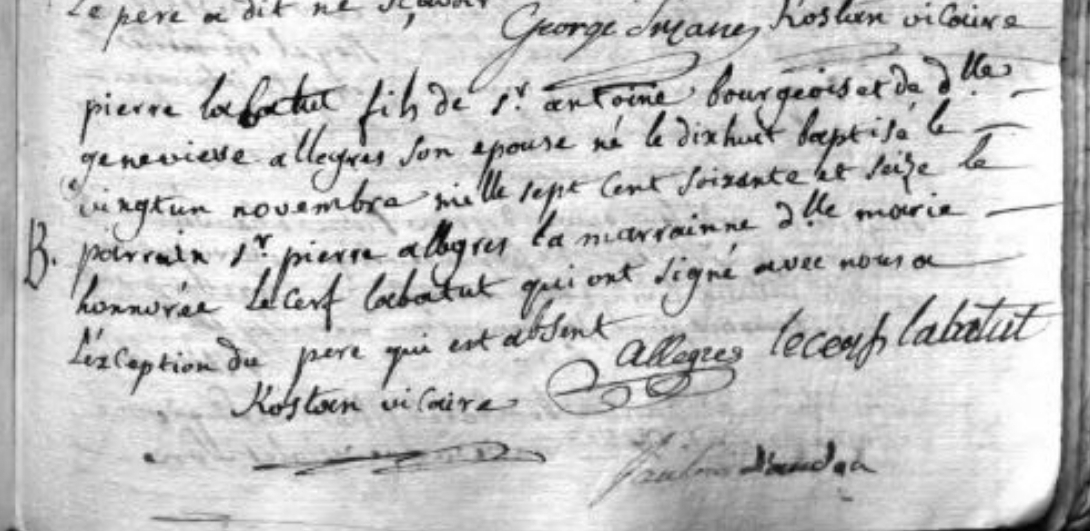
Baptismal register of Pierre Labatut.

He was born in Cannes on 18 November 1776, to Antoine Labatut and his wife Geneviève Allègre. On 26 October 1807, Labatut's ship was captured by the 40-gun British frigate HMS Unite, on the coast of Corfu. He was imprisoned and later delivered to Maltese authorities on 25 December 1807, and in March 1808 he was transported to England on board of the troopship Constantine. On 22 August 1810, he appeared before Douzy, the vice-consul of France in Philadelphia, and came to request financial assistance to return to France and join its military corps.

== Military career ==
=== In Colombia ===
After being nominated general-in-chief of the Venezuelan Army, Francisco de Miranda started looking for French and British mercenaries, and recruited Pierre Labatut. In September 1812, Labatut took command of the militias of Cartagena. He was later nominated governor of Santa Marta, however, the population rebelled against him and he was forced to abandon the city. Consequently, he was fired of the command and exiled to the Antilles, staying there for three or four years. He did not leave empty-handed, the government of New Grenada awarded him for his services rendered a monthly pension for life of 100 pesos strong, which was served to him until 1815. He returned to France, where he tried in vain to return to duty, passed through Madrid in February 1816, Haiti from September to December, and then he went to Brazil.

=== In Brazil ===
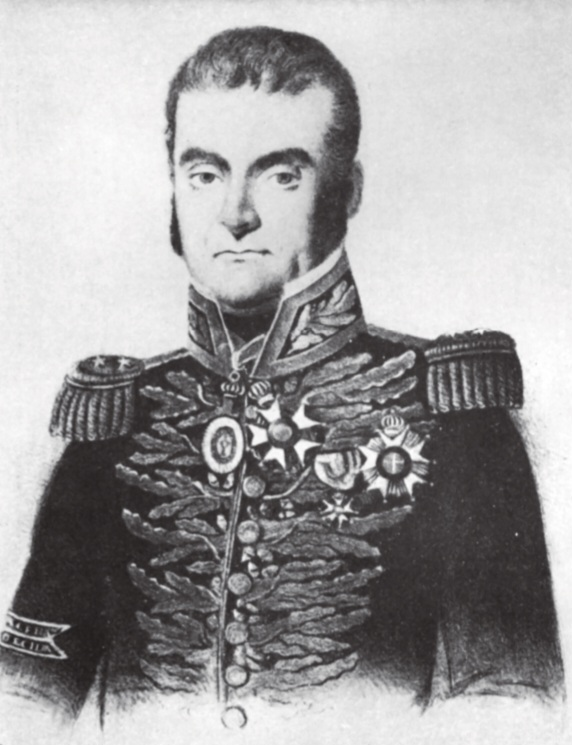
Lithograph portrait by Jules Peyre

Labatut arrived in Rio de Janeiro in 1821. He was living in Laranjeiras with his wife Clairine Labatut and his son Emanuel Antônio. As a Freemason, he became closer to José Bonifácio, and was a friend of General Dirk van Hogendorp, a former aide-de-camp to Napoleon who was living in Tijuca since 1817.

On 3 July 1822, he accepted the service offered by Prince Regent Pedro, and he was given the rank of general de brigada, because of the shortage of officers in the newly organized army. On 9 July, he was nominated commander-in-chief of the relief troops to the patriots of Bahia raised against the Portuguese Brigadier Madeira de Melo, and then receive of Emperor Pedro I full powers for this expedition. On 8 November 1822, in Pirajá, the first major battle of the war took place. The soldiers of General Madeira de Melo were completely beaten and fled in disorder. On 22 January 1823, Labatut was nominated military governor of Bahia. From 15 to 20 February, he pursued the Portuguese forces in the city's suburbs and, on 3 May, he launched his troops to attack the city. General Madeira then decides to leave Bahia. His garrison boarded the squadron assembled there to guarantee the withdrawal of the troops.

Victim of calumny, Labatut was frustrated with the final victory of his rivals and accusers. One of them, Colonel Lima e Silva, made his "glorious and solemn" entry into liberated Bahia on 2 July 1823, while Labatut, arrested, waited to go to the council of war, which took place in 1824. Labatut left it completely acquitted and exonerated. Later, his military career at the head of the Brazilian army experienced ups and downs due to the strong and lasting enmity with Emperor Pedro I's Minister of War. He was expelled from the army in February 1829, and returned to France on 11 April 1831, four days after Pedro I's abdication. He obtained permission to go to Europe, from 17 June 1833 until the final of September 1834. Returning to Brazil, he was reinstated there with his former rank of general de brigada, and he also received Brazilian citizenship on this same occasion. After having carried out several actions, he was promoted on 2 December 1839 to marechal de campo.

=== Ragamuffin War ===
He fought in the Ragamuffin War against David Canabarro. His battalion arrived in Passo Fundo, but was wiped out in September 1840.

Labatut left active service in 1842, and died in Salvador on 4 September 1849, in the street Rua dos Barris. The street was later renamed in his honor to Rua General Labatut.

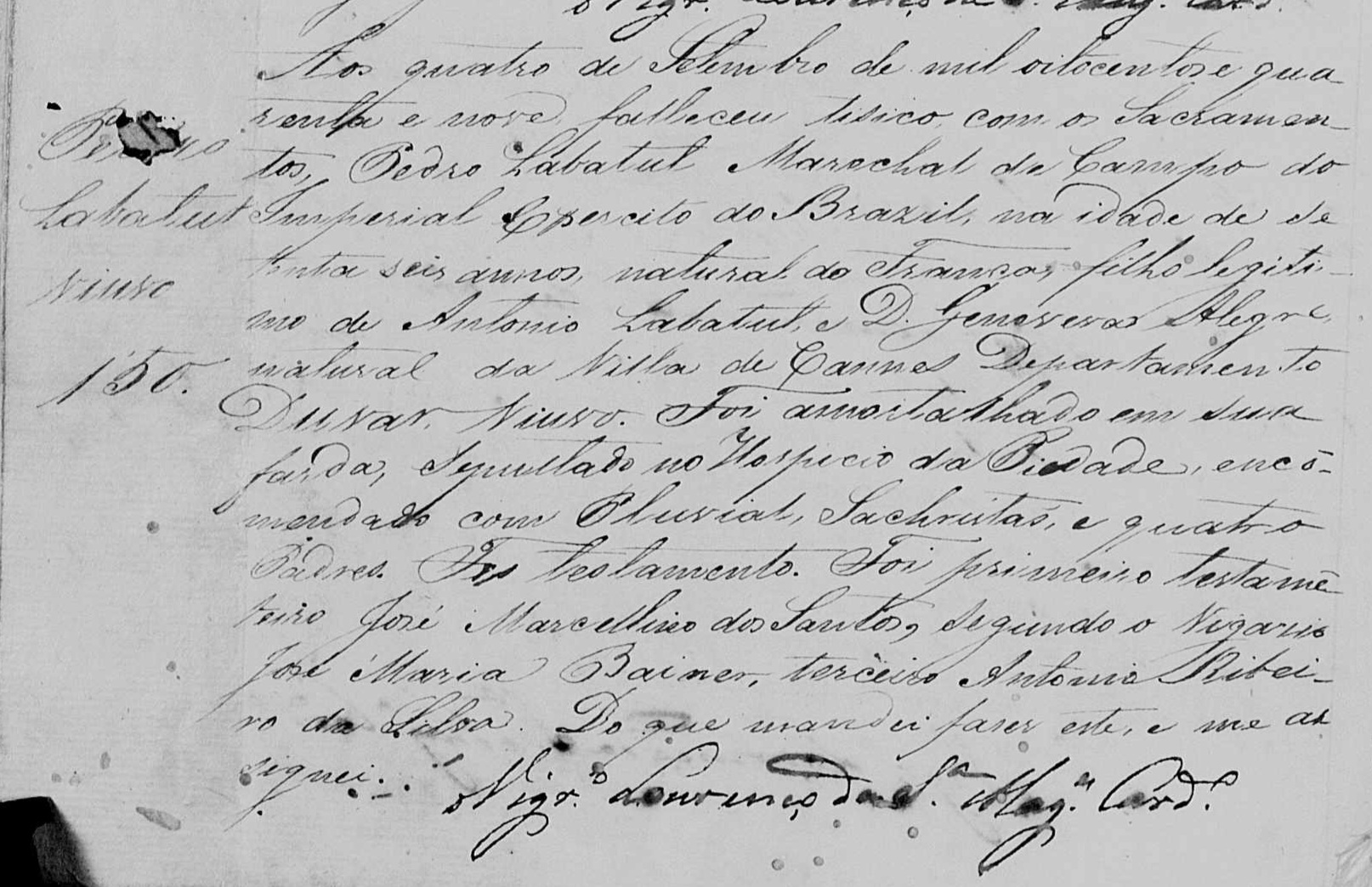
Labatut's death certificate, dated 4 September 1849, stating that he died of tuberculosis
