= Johan Carl Peter Prytz =

Danish sailor (1789–1862)

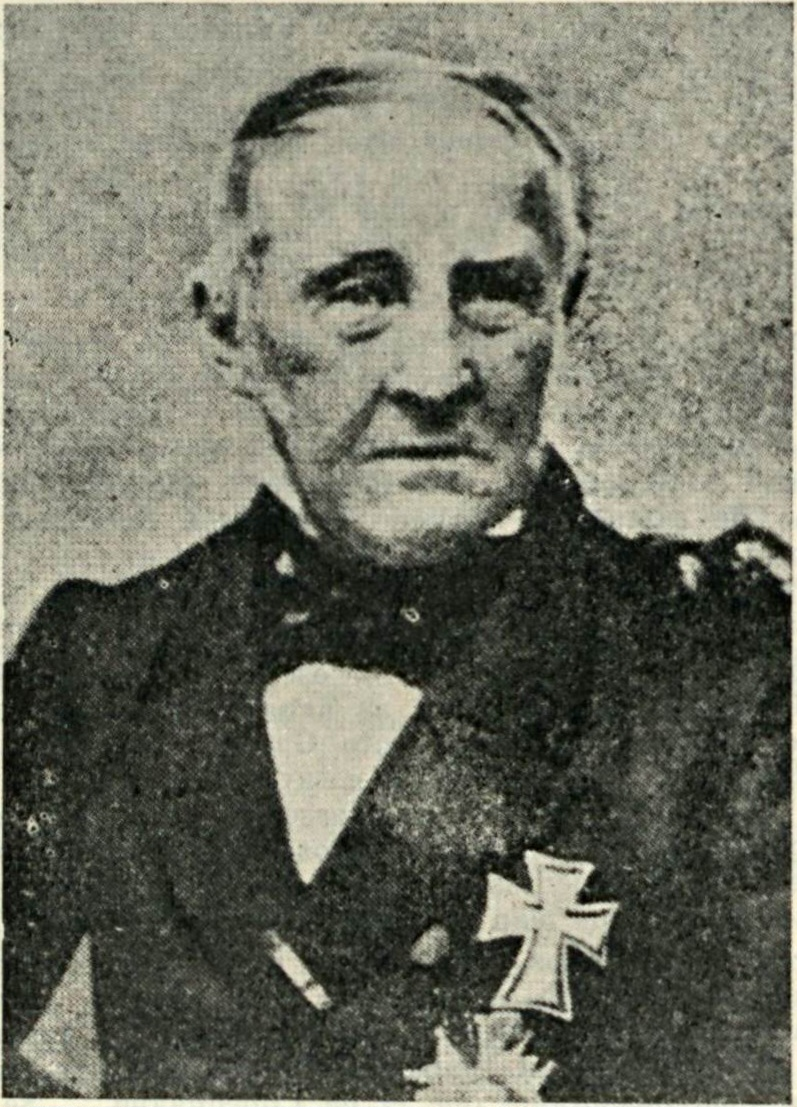
- Prytz in his old age
- Nickname: João Carlos Pedro Prytz
- Born: 16 August 1789; Copenhagen, Denmark
- Died: 11 November 1862 (aged 73) Copenhagen, Denmark
- Buried: Holmen Cemetery
- Allegiance: Denmark-Norway; Empire of Brazil
- Branch: Danish Navy; Imperial Brazilian Navy
- Service years: 1800–1825 (Denmark-Norway); 1825–1831 (Brazil)
- Rank: (Denmark–Norway) Lieutenant (Empire of Brazil) Counter admiral
- Commands: Dona Paula (1826)
- Conflicts: Gunboat War; Cisplatine War; Battle of Los Pozos; Battle of Quilmes; Battle of Punta de Quilmes; Battle of Monte Santiago
- Awards: Order of the Dannebrog; Saint Helena Medal
- Spouses: Suzette Marianne Scheitmann (m. 1809; died 1830) Sophie Henriette Julie Amsinch (m. 1833)

Johan Carl Peter Prytz (Note: Known in Portuguese as João Carlos Pedro Prytz.) (16 August 1789 – 11 November 1862) was a Danish mariner who served the Danish, French and Brazilian navies and saw combat during the Napoleonic and Cisplatine Wars.

== Biography ==
Johan Carl Peter Prytz was born in Copenhagen on 16 August 1789 to Lauritz Peter Prytz and Mette Kirstine Prytz, née Möller.

Prytz married twice, first on 3 March 1809 to Suzette Marianne Scheitmann (1787–1830) and second on 1 July 1833 to Sophie Henriette Julie Amsinch (1817–1897).

Prytz joined the Royal Danish Naval Academy in 1800 as an aspirant. He was promoted to second lieutenant on 27 December 1805 and to first lieutenant on 17 March 1811. In 1811, he commanded a gunboat flotilla stationed in Kalundborg, and on 28 January 1812, he was made a knight of the Order of the Dannebrog.

He first served in the Danish Navy as a young man, where he fought against the British in his birthplace, and later in the French Navy.

Prytz joined the Imperial Brazilian Navy in 1825, and was part of the First Division, also called División Bloqueo, of the Brazilian navy operating in the waters of the Río de la Plata during the Cisplatine War. The mission of this squadron, initially commanded by James Norton but eventually taken over by Prytz, was to blockade the primary Argentine port of Buenos Aires. Although the squadron had superior resources compared to the Argentine navy, commanded by William Brown, it was unable to stop the Argentines from routinely escaping.

While in command of the frigate Dona Paula, Prytz participated in the naval battles of Los Pozos on 11 June 1826 and Quilmes on 30 June 1826.

On 8 April 1827, Prytz—by that time a commodore, was one of the participants in the Battle of Monte Santiago, in which the superior firepower of the Brazilians forced two grounded Argentine brigs to rely on the support of a schooner. Prytz would eventually reach the rank of counter admiral and left Brazilian service in 1831 (or 1835).

He was made a commander of the Order of the Dannebrog on 28 June 1837. He received the Saint Helena Medal on 17 February 1858.

Prytz died in Copenhagen on 18 November 1862, and was buried in Holmen Cemetery.

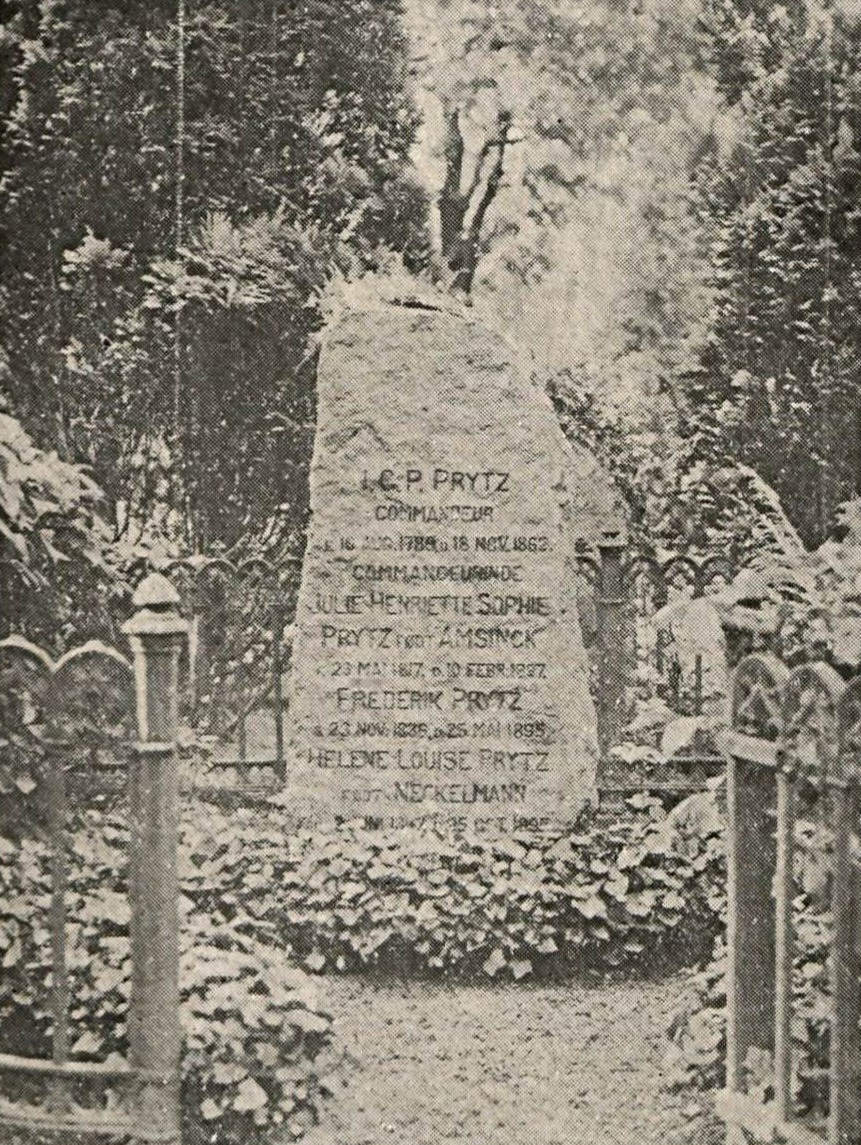
Prytz's family valt in Holmen Cemetery
