= Surat Castle (ship) =

At least two vessels have been named Surat Castle for Surat Castle:

- Surat Castle (1788 ship) was launched at Surat as a country ship, that is, a vessel that traded around and from India, staying east of the Cape of Good Hope. She originally was intended for the cotton trade with China. From 1796 to 1817 she made nine voyages for the British East India Company (EIC). She then made one more voyage under a license from the EIC. She made one more voyage to India, this time under a licence from the EIC and then disappeared from easily accessible online sources after her sale in 1819.
- Surat Castle (1824 ship) was launched at Blackwall. In 1825 she sailed to Brazil to serve as the Brazilian Navy's frigate Dona Paula in the Cisplatine War. She was wrecked in 1827.
