= Surat Castle (1824 ship) =

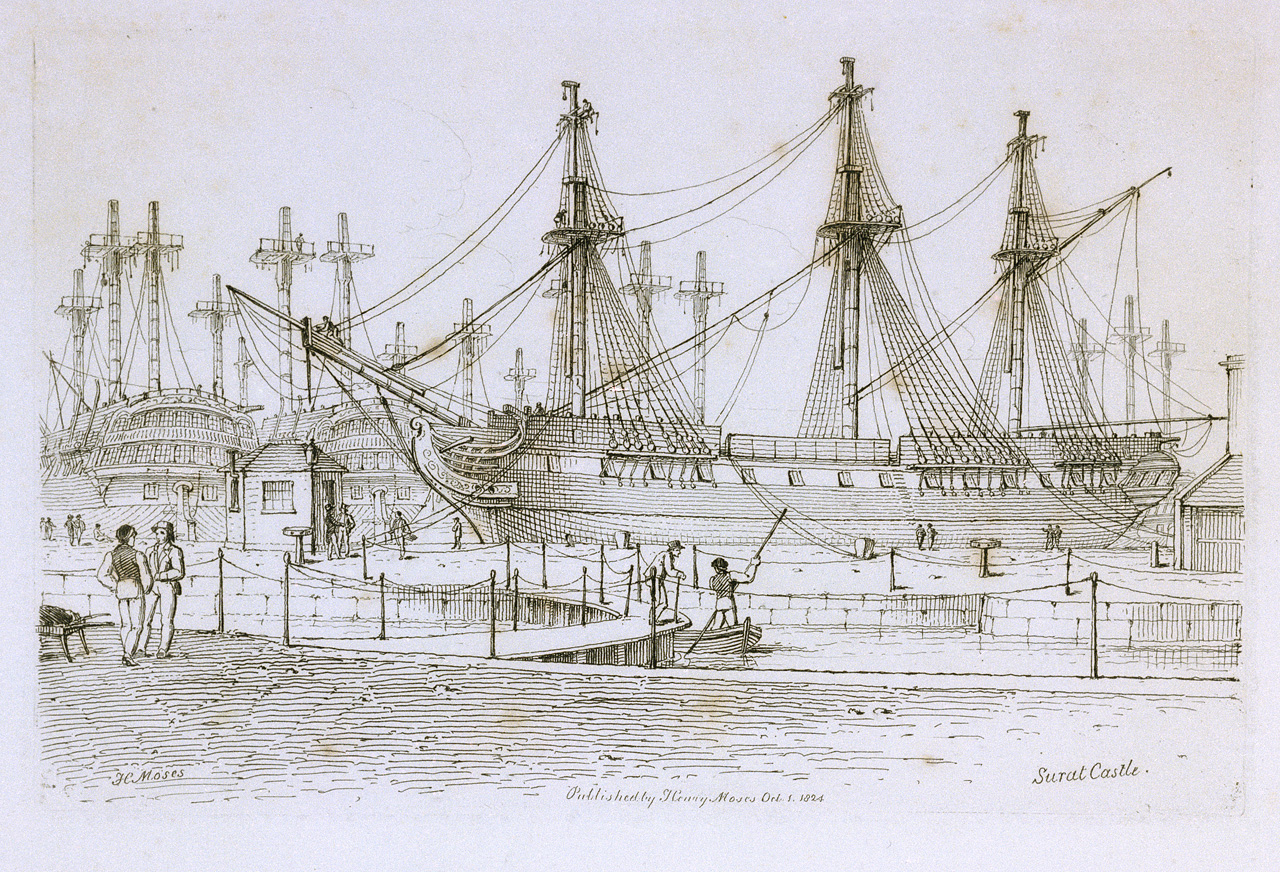
- Surat Castle (1824) in the East India Dock at Blackwall

History

United Kingdom
- Name: Surat Castle
- Namesake: Surat Castle
- Builder: Wigram's & Green, Blackwall
- Launched: 8 November 1824
- Fate: Sold 1825 to Bassett & Co., London; resold

Empire of Brazil
- Name: Dona Paula, or Donna Paula, or Donna Paulo
- Namesake: Princess Paula of Brazil
- Acquired: 1825 by purchase
- Fate: Wrecked 2 October 1827

General characteristics
- Tons burthen: 1,22366/94 (bm)
- Armament: 38 guns

Surat Castle was a ship launched in 1824, at Blackwall, London. In 1825, she sailed to Brazil to serve as the Imperial Brazilian Navy's frigate Dona Paula in the Cisplatine War. She was wrecked in 1827.

== Career ==
Surat Castle was built for Johnson & Meaburn. She may have been sold in 1825 to Bassett & Co., London. The Brazilian government purchased her and after extensive repairs (perhaps including lengthening by 11 feet), she sailed to Rio de Janeiro.

On 25 June 1825, Surat Castle, Dowton, master, reported at Custom House outward bound for Rio Janeiro and Teneriffe. On 14 July, she was at Deal, waiting to sail to Rio de Janeiro. She arrived at Rio de Janeiro from London on 3 September.

Surat Castle was renamed Dona Paula and assigned to the First Division, also called Divisão Bloqueio, of the Imperial Brazilian Navy operating in the waters of the Río de la Plata. The mission of this squadron was to blockade the primary Argentine port of Buenos Aires. Although the squadron had superior resources compared to the Argentine navy, commanded by William Brown, it was unable to stop the Argentines from routinely escaping.

Captain Johan Carl Peter Prytz replaced Norton. While in command of Dona Paula, Prytz participated in the naval battles of Los Pozos on 11 June 1826, and Quilmes on 30 June 1826. The Battle of Los Pozos took place between the Argentine and Brazilian forces in view of Buenos Aires. Argentina had only eleven ships as opposed to Brazil's thirty-one warships.

Capitão-de-mar-e-guerra Cândido Francisco de Brito Vitória replaced Prytz, who went on to be a commodore. Between 7 and 8 April 1827, Dona Paula was Norton's flagship at the battle of Monte Santiago. It was a decisive Brazilian victory in which the Argentines lost two of their best ships.

== Fate ==
Dona Paula was wrecked on 2 October 1827, at the Ilha do Francês, off Cabo Frio (Arraial do Cabo) while pursuing an Argentine privateer. The subsequent court martial sentenced her captain to a two-year suspension from the Brazilian Navy with the loss of all pay, and to one year in prison at the Ilha das Cobras in Rio de Janeiro. All his subordinate officers received sentences of imprisonment that varied in their duration depending on each officer's rank.

== Note ==
In 1825, the press misidentified Surat Castle as a vessel that the Mexican government had purchased, renamed Libertad, Libertdo, or Libertador, and in 1825, sailed to Cuba to lead a squadron blockading the Spanish at Havana. This later led other sources to conflate her with Surat Castle.

== See also ==
- List of historical ships of the Brazilian Navy
