= Quilmes (disambiguation) =

Quilmes is a city located within Quilmes Partido (district) in Buenos Aires Province, Argentina.

Quilmes may also refer to:

== History and archaeology ==
- Quilmes people, a tribe of the Diaguita Indigenous people
  - Ruins of Quilmes, an archaeological site in Tucumán Province
- Battle of Quilmes, a military conflict between present-day Argentina and Brazil
- Battle of Punta de Quilmes, a minor naval battle fought during the Cisplatine War

== Places ==
- Quilmes Partido, a Partido (district) of Buenos Aires Province, Argentina
  - Quilmes Airport, a public airfield
- Quilmes y Los Sueldos, a Comuna Rural (rural comune) in Tucumán Province, Argentina

== Sports ==
- Quilmes Atlético Club, an Argentine sports club
  - Quilmes Atlético Club (women's football), the women's division of the football team
  - Estadio Centenario Ciudad de Quilmes, also known as Quilmes Stadium, where the above team plays
- Argentino de Quilmes, an Argentine sports club
- Quilmes de Mar del Plata, an Argentine sports club
- Círculo Universitario de Quilmes, an Argentine rugby union club

== Organizations ==
- National University of Quilmes, a public university in Quilmes Partido
- Diocese of Quilmes, a Roman Catholic bishopric

== Other uses ==
- Cerveza Quilmes, an Argentine brewery and its flagship pale lager beer
  - Quilmes Rock, a prominent Argentine rock festival sponsored by the brewery
