= J.J. Training College =

Teacher training institute in Surat, India

Coordinates: 21.196°N 72.82°E

J.J. Training College was formerly an English school established in 1827 from the donation by Seth Sorabji Jamshedji Jijibhai. Later this school was known as "Sorabji Jamshedji Jijibhai High School". In 1939 the high school was closed by the government to begin a college for training primary school teachers.

The collage is located in front of Surat Castle, in Surat in the western Indian state of Gujarat.

== See also ==
List of tourist attractions in Surat
