= Jacinto Roque de Sena Pereira =

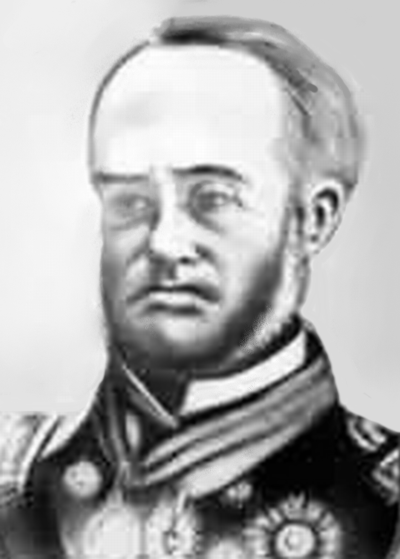
- Pereira
- Born: c. 1784; Lisbon, Kingdom of Portugal
- Died: 27 June 1850 Empire of Brazil
- Allegiance: Kingdom of Portugal; United Kingdom of Portugal, Brazil and the Algarves; Empire of Brazil
- Branch: (Kingdom of Portugal) Portuguese Navy; Imperial Brazilian Navy
- Conflicts: Cisplatine War

Jacinto Roque de Sena Pereira (c. 1784 – 27 June 1850) was a Portuguese-born Brazilian sailor notable for his service to the United Kingdom of Portugal, Brazil and the Algarves and later the Empire of Brazil.

His naval career culminated with a period of squadron command. For nearly a decade he was in charge of a squadron on the Uruguay River, using the schooner Oriental as his flagship. He prepared for the Portuguese invasion of 1816, which resulted in the defeat of the troops led by José Gervasio Artigas and the annexation of the Banda Oriental to the Kingdom of Brazil as the Cisplatina province. He was considered a consummate planner, especially in the area of combined operations with land forces. His personality, education, and intelligence led him to be involved in many activities, such as diplomacy.

Similar to many Portuguese soldiers active in the Cisplatina province, he married a woman from the region, Eugenia Gadea Paredes from the Soriano Department.

During the Cisplatine War, he was named commander of the Third Division, the Brazilian naval squadron in the Uruguay River. He suffered a major defeat against admiral William Brown in the Battle of Juncal, after which he was taken prisoner. After refusing to give an oath of submission, he succeeded in escaping, and in 1829 he was one of those who entered the plaza of Montevideo as a result of the Preliminary Peace Convention.

He died extremely poor, at the age of 66.
