= Battle of Punta de Quilmes =

1827 Naval battle of the Cisplatine war

- Part of the Cisplatine War
Date	24 February 1827
Location	Río de la Plata 34°41′43″S 58°12′06″W
Result	Argentine victory

Belligerents
Empire of Brazil	(Argentina) United Provinces

Commanders and leaders
Johan Carl Peter Prytz	William Brown

Strength
1 frigate 1 corvette 4 brigs 4 schooners	1 brig 4 schooners 9 gunboats

Casualties and losses
1 schooner sunk 117 dead	7 dead 10 wounded

The Battle of Punta de Quilmes was a minor naval battle fought in 27 February 1827 during the Cisplatine War. The action was indecisive, with neither fleet managing to decisively engage the other, but the Brazilian schooner Dois de Dezembro was sunk after a long-range cannon shot hit its gunpowder storage, while the Argentine fleet managed to reach Buenos Aires, which was its goal.

== Engagement and aftermath ==
After the decisive Argentine victory at the Battle of Juncal, William Brown, the commander of the Argentine fleet, left the harbour at Martín García Island, sailing towards Buenos Aires, which was still blockaded by a Brazilian naval division under Admiral Johan Carl Peter Prytz. The Argentine force was composed of a brig, four schooners, 9 gunboats and 13 prize ships.

Pritz's fleet was composed of the frigate Imperatriz, a corvette, four brigs and four schooners. It was anchored off Quilmes, blocking access to Buenos Aires from the south. Though the Imperial ships were stronger both in number and guns than the Argentine, the shallowness of the waters around Buenos Aires made it difficult for them to maneuver. When the Brazilian ships spotted Brown's force, and started sailing towards it, the Imperatriz soon got stuck on some sandbar. Though it managed to get unstuck in time to take part in the battle, this event delayed the Imperial fleet, making it so that the engagement only took place at a long range.

The Argentine gunboat n° 12, under the command of Second Lieutenant Henry Wildblood, hit the schooner Dois de Dezembro, bearing two guns, under Second Lieutenant José Narciso de Brum's command. The 24-pound round hit the Brazilian warship in its powder storage (which had 30 barrels of gunpowder at the time). The resulting explosion was such that Dois de Dezembro was quickly sunk, and only 3 out of its 120 crewmen survived and were rescued. The Brazilian warship sank 1,500 metres (1,600 yd) east of Club Naútico Quilmes where its remains where recovered and moved to the Almirante Brown museum in Bernal after a low tide exposed them in 1934.
