= Jonas Coe =

American-born naval commander for Argentina, Chile & Uruguay (1805-1864)

Jonas Halstead Coe
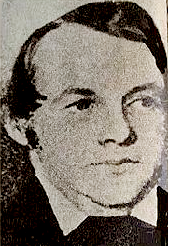
- Commodore Jonas Halstead Coe
- Born: September 21, 1805; Springfield, New Jersey; United States
- Died: October 30, 1864 (aged 59); Buenos Aires, Argentina
- Burial place: La Recoleta cemetery
- Spouse: Trinidad Balcarce (m. 1828)
- Military career
- Allegiance: Chile; Argentina; Uruguay
- Branch: Chilean Navy; Argentine Navy; Uruguayan Navy
- Service years: 1824-1853
- Rank: Commodore
- Nickname: Juan Coe
- Conflicts: Peruvian War of Independence; Cisplatine War; Uruguayan Civil War; Argentine Civil Wars

Jonas Halstead Coe (September 21, 1805 – October 30, 1864), sometimes given in Spanish as Comodoro Juan Coe, was an American-born naval commander, notable in the early naval history of Argentina and Uruguay.

== Early years ==
Coe was born in Springfield Township, Union County, New Jersey, in 1805.

== Service history ==
=== In Peruvian waters ===
In 1824, at the age of 18, Coe joined the Chilean fleet, then commanded by Lord Cochrane, and served on board the brig Protector during the Peruvian War of Independence.

=== Cisplatine War ===
Serving as an officer in the Argentine fleet under Admiral William Brown, he achieved distinction in the battles of Juncal and Monte Santiago in the Cisplatine War that led to the Uruguayan independence in 1828.

=== Service in the Uruguayan Navy ===
After the war with Brazil, he moved to Montevideo and became a partisan of Fructuoso Rivera and the Colorado Party.

At the beginning of the Uruguayan Civil War, he was given the rank of commodore and placed in command over the fledgling Uruguayan Navy's Escuadra Oriental, consisting of the flagship Cagancha; the corvettes Constitución, Sarandi, and 25 de Mayo; the brig Pereyra; and the schooner General Rivera.

Although Brown's fleet was of similar size, Coe remained in harbor at Montevideo under the protection of the shore batteries for two months. On May 24, 1841, thinking Brown's forces to be scattered, he sailed out of the harbor only to be forced to retreat back in at dusk. He remained in harbor until August 3, when the Battle of Santa Lucía River saw the General Rivera sunk. In his third engagement on December 9, the Argentine brig Belgrano captured the Cagancha and all her crew.

Following these reverses, President Rivera appointed Italian skipper Giuseppe Garibaldi to the rank of colonel and created the command of the 2ª División de la Escuadra Oriental, transferring most of Coe's ships to the new fleet. The new unit achieved some success before being routed by Admiral Brown in the battle of Costa Brava, on the Paraná River.

After this, the war simply became a siege of Montevideo, with Argentina and the Blancos in control of the sea, but the supply to the port was granted by Britain.

=== Return to Argentina ===
With the war in Uruguay over and Rosas overthrown in Argentina, Coe was appointed by Justo José de Urquiza commander of the Confederation fleet which blockaded the city in the siege of Buenos Aires after the Province seceded from the central government, becoming the State of Buenos Aires in September 1852. Coe, aboard the steamer Constitución, defeated a Buenos Aires flotilla 30 miles off Martín García island on April 18, 1853, when his squadron captured the enemy brigs Enigma and 11 de Septiembre with 22 officers and 200 men. On June 26, however, Coe deserted to the United States aboard the American sloop USS Jamestown after being bribed by Buenos Aires' citizens.

== Personal life ==
On July 7, 1828, Coe married Trinidad Balcarce, daughter of Argentine General Juan Ramon Balcarce and Trinidad García Balcarce, in Buenos Aires. The couple's first child, Dolores Coe Balcarce, was born in 1830.

== Death and legacy ==
Coe eventually returned to Buenos Aires, Argentina, where he died on October 30, 1864, the father of ten children. His remains were buried at the family's grave in La Recoleta cemetery. He is the namesake of the ROU Comodoro Coe (07), a French-designed Vigilante-class patrol boat of the Uruguayan Navy commissioned in 1981.
