= Juncal Island =

Island in Uruguay

Isla Juncal
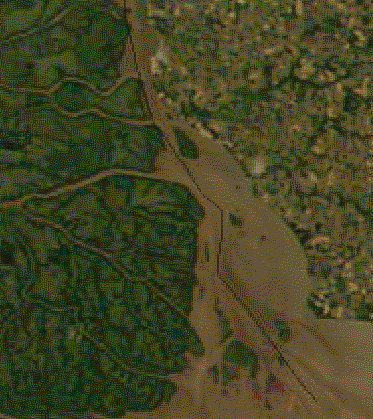
- Satellite picture of the upper Río de la Plata; Juncal Island is the large island above center
- Interactive map of Juncal Island

Geography
- Location: Río de la Plata
- Coordinates: 33°58′12.0″S 58°22′40.8″W
- Length: 4.91 km (3.051 mi)
- Width: 1.95 km (1.212 mi)

Administration
- Uruguay
- Department: Colonia

Juncal Island is an island belonging to Uruguay, located where the Uruguay River empties into the Río de la Plata, a bit above the Uruguayan town of Carmelo. It is separated from Uruguay by the Canal de Camacho.

The much smaller Juncalito Island lies a kilometer north; to the west, separated by the principal channel, lies Portuguese Island (Isla del Portugues), which belongs to the Argentine province of Entre Rios.

== History ==
The chief historical event associated with Juncal Island is the Battle of Juncal, one of the most important naval battles of the Cisplatine War. Occurring on 8 and 9 February, 1827 between squadrons of the Brazilian Empire and the United Provinces of the Río de la Plata, the result was a complete victory for the United Provinces.

== Description ==
From a geological point of view, the island is a mass of riverine affluvient founded on a precambrian granite core. The coasts are sandy and feature gentle inclines near the channels. The island is low and flat, and can be completely submerged during high water. It has a total length of 4.91 km and a maximum width of 1.95 km.

The western coast of the island is washed with waters from the river Guazú in addition to those of the Uruguay River from the north, while the east receives the cleaner and more oxygenated waters of the Camacho River; in this area a type of fish called a pejerrey (Odontesthes bonariensis) can be found in abundance. As a result, it is a habitual destination for fishing boats.

The vegetation of the island is primarily scrubland, although some trees can be found towards the center.
