= Surat Castle (1788 ship) =

Trade Vessel based out of India in the late 1700s

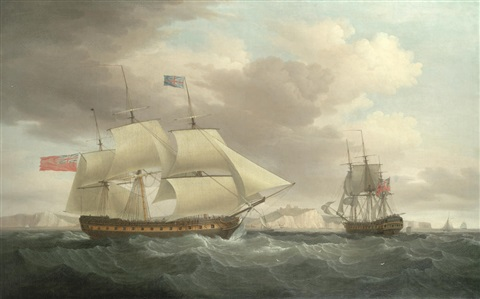
- The East Indiaman Surat Castle, in two positions calling, for a pilot off Dover, 1790; Thomas Whitcombe

History

Great Britain
- Namesake: Surat Castle
- Builder: Surat, or Bombay Dockyard
- Launched: 25 March 1788, or 1789, or 1790
- Fate: Sold 1819

General characteristics 1796 measurement
- Tons burthen: 963, or 1000 (bm)
- Length: Overall: 137 ft 11 in (42.0 m); Keel: 107 ft 1 in (32.6 m)
- Beam: 41 ft 0 in (12.5 m)
- Depth of hold: 15 ft 3 in (4.6 m)

General characteristics 1806 measurement
- Tons burthen: 1139, or 1149, or 114943/94, or 114956/94 (bm)
- Length: Overall: 157 ft 10 in (48.1 m); Keel: 127 ft 0 in (38.7 m)
- Beam: 41 ft 3 in (12.6 m)
- Depth of hold: 15 ft 3 in (4.6 m)
- Complement: 1791:100; 1796:120; 1804:150; 1807:130
- Armament: 1791:12 guns; 1796:26 × 6&9-pounder guns; 1796:20 × 9-pondr + 6 × 6-pounder guns; 1804:50 × 12&18-pounder guns; 1807:36 × 18-pounder guns

Surat Castle was launched at Surat in 1788 as a country ship, that is, a vessel that traded around and from India, staying east of the Cape of Good Hope. She originally was intended for the cotton trade with China. From 1796 to 1817 she made nine voyages for the British East India Company (EIC). She then made one more voyage under a license from the EIC. She made one more voyage to India, this time under a licence from the EIC and then disappeared from easily accessible online sources after her sale in 1819.

== Origins ==
Surat Castle was built in Surat, though some sources specify the Bombay Dockyard. The most complete listing of vessels built in the Bombay Dockyard makes no mention of her. She was built for the cotton trade, her capacity being rated as 4500 bales.

The first readily available contemporary mention of Surat Castle was in 1791 when Lloyd's List reported that she had arrived at Canton having sustained damage in the "Chinese Seas". Her master was a Captain Laurie.

Then in 1793 she arrived at Canton again, this time with 30 chests of opium.

At some point in 1793 Marrata pirates attacked Surat Castle. She repulsed the attack, but not before her master, Mr. Lowry, had been seriously wounded.

== EIC ==
A press report in 1796 stated that the Bombay government had taken up a new ship of 1000 tons, built at Bombay, to carry freight to China, and then to proceed to England from China.

EIC voyage #1 (1796): Surat Castle, Lawrie, master, was reported at China from Madras. Captain Henry Laurie sailed from Whampoa Anchorage on 8 February 1796. Surat Castle reached Macao on 15 February and St Helena on 6 May. She arrived at the Downs on 3 August.

After Surat Castle arrived in London the EIC had her measured. These measurements yielded a burthen of 963 tons. However, all subsequent mentions, starting in late November 1796, gave her a burthen of 1139 or 1149 tons. When the EIC had her measured again in 1806 the measurements confirmed a burthen of 1149 tons. The difference was due to an increase by 20 ft (6.1 m) in her length between the two measurements. Though her entries in various volumes of Lloyd's Register did not mention a lengthening, it must have occurred between her arrival on 3 August and late November.

Surat Castle was admitted to registry in Great Britain on 28 September. The mention gave her place of launch as Bombay, though earlier the same volume gave it as Surat. It also gave her burthen as 1149 tons. On 21 November Captain Henry Lawrie acquired a letter of marque, which listed her burthen as 1139 tons. On 24 November Surat Castle, Lawrie, master, was at Portsmouth from the Downs, having left Gravesend on 13 November.

Surat Castle first appeared in Lloyd's Register (LR) in 1797.

Year	Master	Owner	Trade	Source
1797	D.Isbister	Lennox &Co.	London–Bombay	LR

On 31 July 1797 Surat Castle arrived at Portsmouth from the West Indies. On 17 August she was at Gravesend, having come from St Kitts. She was one of five vessels that the government had chartered to carry invalids and prisoners from the West Indies. The other four were Bombay Anna, Bengal Anna, Carron, and Coromandel. In August the Directors of the EIC agreed to permit Bombay Anna, Bengal Anna, Carron, and Surat Castle to return to the Indies with exports to proceed to China and then to return to England with early cargoes for the EIC, in accordance with the engagement they had entered into before they had gone to the West Indies at the government's behest.

On 23 October Surat Castle was at Deal, waiting to sail to India.

EIC voyage #2 (1797–1799): Captain David Ibister sailed from Portsmouth 6 November 1797, bound for Bombay and China.Surat Castle arrived at Madeira on 22 November and the Cape on 6 February 1798. She reached Cochin on 25 April and arrived at Bombay on 31 May. She next arrived at Whampoa on 9 October. On 2 November an ounce or more of burnt cotton was found in the hold abreast of the after hatchway. Attempted arson was suspected. Bound for England, Surat Castle crossed the Second Bar on 6 January 1799, and reached Malacca on 22 February and St Helena on 19 May. She arrived at the Downs on 28 July.

In January 1800 Surat Castle sailed from England with parts of the 22nd Regiment of Foot, bound for the Cape. At Portsmouth she was to join Scaleby Castle and Minerva. Scalaby Castle was to embark troops too. The three were to sail with the Africa convoy. They were to proceed from the Cape to Bombay and there pick up cargo for England on the EIC's account.

EIC voyage #3 (1801): Captain Ibister sailed from Bombay on 11 April 1801. Surat Castle reached the Cape on 15 July and St Helena on 19 August, and arrived at the Downs on 31 October. Of the 123 lascars in her crew 36 died during the voyage and 45 were ill when she arrived in London.

Year	Master	Owner	Trade	Source
1801	D.Isbester	Lennox & Co.	London–India	LR
1804	D.Isbester	Lennox & Co.	London–India	LR

Captain David Isbister acquired a letter of marque on 17 September 1804. Surat Castle was reported in October to have put into the Tagus to repair. She had rolled her main-topmast and her mizzen-top-gallant mast overboard in the Bay of Biscay after she had left Plymouth. She arrived at Bombay on 5 May 1805 from Lisbon.

EIC voyage #4 (1806): Captain David Ibister sailed from Whampoa on 18 March 1806. Surat Castle was at Malacca on 27 April and St Helena on 12 August. She arrived at the Downs on 27 October.

The EIC had Surat Castle repaired and measured by Wells, prior to engaging her for four voyages.

EIC voyage #5 (1807–1809): Captain George Robertson acquired a letter of marque on 12 March 1807. Captain Alexander Robertson sailed from Portsmouth on 18 April 1807, bound for China. She was part of a convoy under escort by HMS Jupiter. On 15 June they were at 5°10′N 22°30′W "all well". However, Surat Castle had become leaky and it was determined that she should go into a port. Surat Castle was at Rio de Janeiro on 1 July. Part of her cargo was damaged. She was repaired and was expected to sail on 10 August. She was at Sulu on 29 November, and Penang on 28 January 1808. Her arrival at Penang was welcome news as she had 350 troops on board and it had been feared that she had been lost. She was at Malacca on 6 April. and she arrived at Whampoa on 28 May. Homeward bound, she crossed the Second Bar on 15 July. She was at Malacca on 15 October, Penang on 30 October, and the Cape on 21 January 1809. She reached St Helena on 24 February, and arrived at the Downs on 15 May.

EIC voyage #6 (1810–1811): Captain Alexander Robertson sailed from Portsmouth on 28 April 1810, bound for China. She was at Penang on 6 September and Malacca on 25 September before arriving at Whampoa on 11 December. She crossed the Second Bar on 6 March 1811. She was at Macao on 29 March, reached St Helena on 11 July, and arrived at Falmouth on 18 September.

28 September 1811: Inspector collided with Surat Castle and was subsequently driven ashore at Margate. Inspector was later refloated and take in to Ramsgate, Kent.

EIC voyage #7 (1812–1813): Captain Robertson sailed from Portsmouth on 1 March 1812, bound for China. Surat Castle reached Penang on 16 June and arrived at Whampoa on 8 October. Homeward bound, she crossed the Second Bar on 13 January, reached St Helena on 5 April, and arrived at the Downs on 5 June.

EIC voyage #8 (1814–1815): Captain Robertson sailed from Portsmouth on 22 February 1814, bound for Batavia and China. Surat Castle arrived at Batavia on 4 July. She visited Samarang on 9 August before returning to Batavia on 5 September. On 25 September she was at Banaca, on 1 November she reached Lintin Island, and on 1 December arrived at Whampoa. Homeward bounde, she crossed the Second Bar on 4 February 1815. She reached the Cape on 2 May Cape and St Helena on 4 June, and arrived at the Downs on 19 August.

EIC voyage #9 (1816–1817): Captain William Hope sailed from the Downs on 17 April 1816 for China. Surat Castle arrived at Whampoa on 5 September. Homeward bound, she crossed the Second Bar on 21 December. She reached St Helena on 20 March 1817 and arrived back at the Downs on 29 May.

== Licensed trader ==
Between 1817 and 1819 Surat Castle traded between India and London sailing under a license from the EIC. She no longer appeared in Lloyd's Register (LR), or the Register of Shipping and hadn't for a decade.

On 5 November 1817 there appeared an advertisement that Surat Castle, of 1149 tons, James Walker, of the EIC, master, would sail for Bombay on 15 November. She sailed from Deal on 20 December. She stopped at the Cape and reached Bombay. She sailed from Bombay for London on 11 October 1818 and arrived at Gravesend on 30 March 1819.

Surat Castle was offered for sale at auction at Lloyd's Coffee House on 5 October 1819. The advertisement for the auction mentioned that she had often carried upwards of 1600 tons of tea.

More tellingly, she disappeared from the Ship Arrival and Departure (SAD) data in Lloyd's List after 1817, and from newspaper SAD data after 1819.

Surat Castle was a unique name during her career and some sources, e.g. Hackman, have assumed that she was the same Surat Castle that Wigram's and Green had launched in 1824.
