= List of forts in Gujarat =

The following is a partial list of forts in Gujarat, India

- Bhadra Fort, Ahmedabad
- Surat Fort, Surat,
- Bhujia Fort, Bhuj
- Bhuj fort
- Kanthkot Fort, Bhachau
- Manek Burj, Ahmedabad
- Pavagadh
- Roha Fort, Kutch
- Tera Fort, Kutch
- Uparkot Fort, Junagadh
- Songadh Fort, Songadh
- Jhinjhuwada fort
- Vadnagar Fort
- Bharuch fort
- Dabhoi fort
- Bhadra fort, Patan
- Mundra fort
- Palanpur fort
- Idario Gadh, Idar
- Idar fort
- Lakhpat Fort
- Indragad Fort, Palikarambeli
- Sachin Fort, Sachin
- Chhatrapati Shivaji Parnera Fort, Parnera Pardi
- Gaurav Fort
- Gaikwad Fort, Vyara
- Arjungad Fort, Vapi
- Dhoraji fort, Dhoraji
- Roopgadh, Vadiroopgadh, Dang
- Sadra fort, Sadra
- Fort, Indroda, Gandhinagar
- Ancient fort ruins, Taranga
- Campaner fort, Champaner
- Kaligam fort, Ahmedabad
- Dheri Pavathi fort near Dehgam
- Hingolgadh hill fort
- Analgadh
- Vighakot fort
- Fort, Kadi
- Viththalgadh fort
- Pindval fort, Piprol
- Ajmavat Fort, Suravat
- Fort, Upleta
- Fort, Balasinor
- Fort, Gadhka
- Fort, Sandhan
- Ranchhodpuri fort, Lakhtar
- Tuna fort
- Mandvi Fort
- Virani fort, Virani
- Maniara fort
- Chuli fort
- Jasdan fort
- Vajour fort
- Fort, Palanpur
- Ranpur fort
- Paddhari fort
- Fort St. Anthony of Simbor near Una
- Zinzuwada fort
- Gadhshisha fort

== See also ==
- List of forts in India
