= Battle of Los Pozos =

1826 Cisplatine War naval battle

- Part of the Cisplatine War
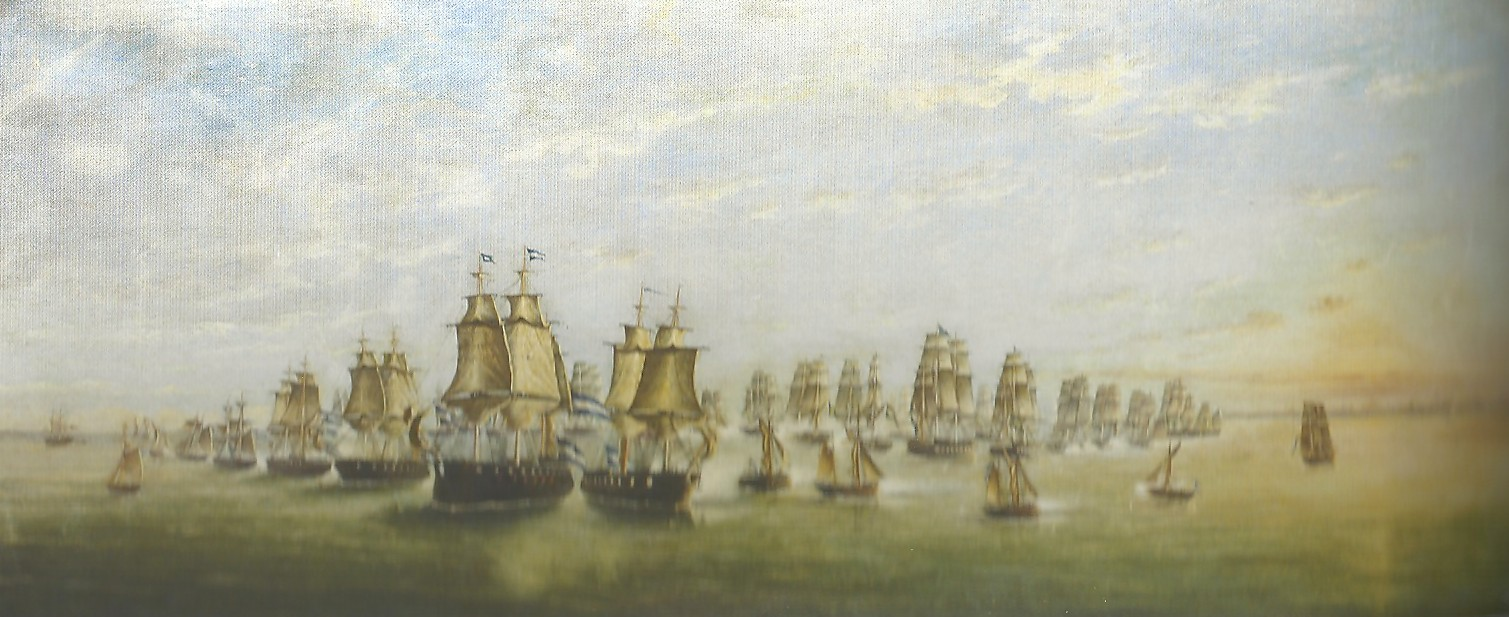
- Combate de los Pozos, by José Murature, 1850
Date	11 June 1826
Location	Off Buenos Aires, United Provinces
Result	Inconclusive

Belligerents
Empire of Brazil	(Argentina) United Provinces

Commanders and leaders
James Norton	William Brown

Strength
31 warships	1 frigate 3 brigs 8 gunboats

Casualties and losses
None	1 dead

The Battle of Los Pozos took place on 11 June 1826 in the Río de la Plata, off Buenos Aires. The larger Brazilian fleet attempted to defeat the Argentine fleet, which had been raiding shipping around Montevideo and attacking Brazilian warships in isolated engagements. The battle was indecisive.

== Background ==
On 10 December 1825, the Empire of Brazil declared war on the United Provinces due to their support to Uruguayan rebels which contested their rule of Cisplatina; the rebels had pledged their loyalty to the United Provinces during the Congreso de la Florida.

On 21 December, a powerful Imperial fleet under Vice admiral Rodrigo Lobo blockaded Buenos Aires. The Argentine government then summoned William Brown to command their small fleet, made up by two brigs and a launch. Over the following weeks, 12 gunboats were incorporated to that force and a frigate, the Veinticinco de Mayo, was acquired, along with another brig and two schooners. The first action against the Brazilian fleet took place on 9 February 1826, at Punta Colares.

== Engagement ==
On 10 June 1826, a powerful Brazilian fleet appeared off Buenos Aires, made up by 31 warships. Brown only had 3 brigs and 8 gunboats under his command, besides the Veinticinco, his flagship. He told the men under his command: 'Sailors and soldiers of the republic: do you see that great floating mountain? It is 31 enemy ships! But do not think your general harbors the smallest fear, for he does not doubt your valor and hopes that you will imitate the Veinticinco de Mayo, which will be sunk before it ever surrenders. Comrades: trust in victory, be disciplined, and give three cheers to the homeland!' Moments later, he commanded, 'fire low, the people are watching us!'. By two in the afternoon action erupted throughout the entire line. The Argentine gunboats attacked the Brazilian flagship, the Nichteroy, which they thought had gotten stuck in a sandbank. When the smoke from the engagement dissipated, the Brazilian fleet was in withdrawal. Only one man died in the engagement, from the Argentine side. The Brazilian withdrawal was motivated by the shallowness of the water near Buenos Aires; they were unable to close in with the Argentine fleet, made up mostly of smaller ships, in a safe manner.

The engagement was hailed as a great victory in the United Provinces, given the disparity of size between both fleets.
