= Battle of Monte Santiago =

1827 Cisplatine War naval battle

Coordinates: 34°49′S 57°57′W

- Part of the Cisplatine War
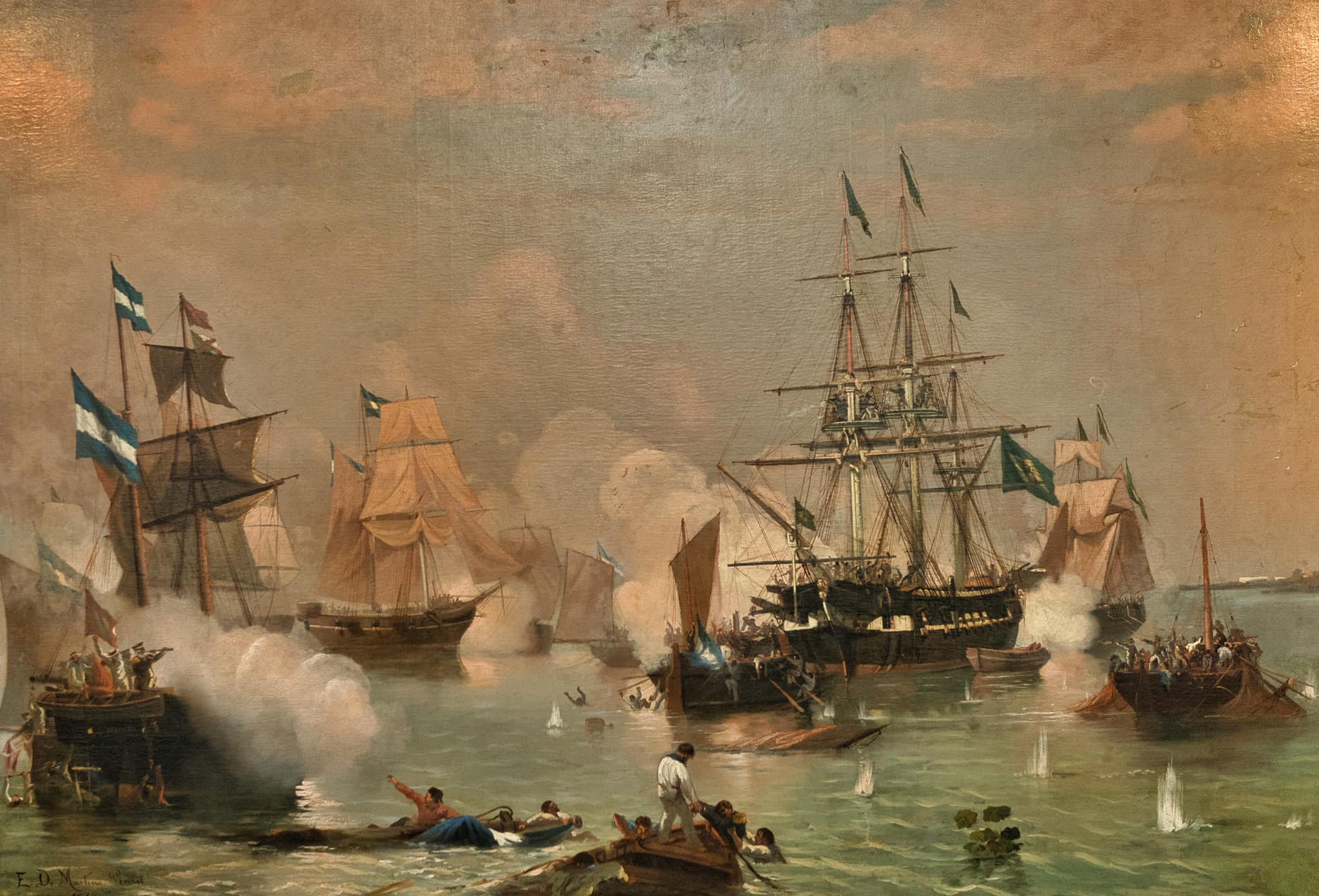
Date	April 7–8, 1827
Location	Ensenada coast, Argentina
Result	Brazilian victory

Belligerents
Empire of Brazil	(Argentina) United Provinces

Commanders and leaders
James Norton	William Brown

Strength
Ships: (Note: 10 or 11 ships were present in the first day, 18 in the second.); 1 frigate 2 corvettes 5 brigs 8 schooners 1 lugger 1 patache Total guns: 229	Ships: 1 corvette 2 brigs 1 schooner Total guns: 65

Casualties and losses
30–40 killed or wounded	2 brigs sunk 1 schooner damaged 54 killed 160 wounded

The Battle of Monte Santiago was fought on 7–8 April 1827, between the Argentine Navy and the Imperial Brazilian Navy, during the Cisplatine War. It was a decisive Brazilian victory, with the allied forces losing its best ships. The battle is highlighted by Argentine historians as one of the most courageous and ferocious naval encounters in the country's history. On that day, Captain Francis Drummond (engaged to Admiral Brown's daughter Elisa) died on deck, firing his marooned ship's cannons instead of retreating.

Its result meant a severe setback for the smaller Argentine Navy. From that moment on, only corsair raids against commerce ships could be undertaken by the Argentine Navy and the naval blockade imposed on Buenos Aires by the Brazilian Navy caused serious problems to the export-oriented Argentine economy.

== The battle ==
The Brazilian Navy had high seas vessels, with more firepower but lesser speed; the Argentine Navy relied on fast maneuvering ships. Some Argentine commanders believed that the lack of manoeuvring of the Imperial vessels in shallow waters and the speed of their own ships could decide some engagements in their favour.

The Argentine squadron

Vessel	Type	Tons burthen	Guns	Complement	Captain
Republica Argentina ex-Upton	Brig	150	4 × 8-pounder guns + 12 × 18-pounder carronades	100	William H. Granville
Independencia ex-Harmony	Brig	258	6 × 12-pounder + 10 × 8-pounder + 6 × 6-pounder guns	120	Francis Drummond
Congresso	Corvette	185	2 × 12-pounder + 16 × 8-pounder guns	110	William Mason
Sarandí	Schooner	150	1 × 18-pounder + 2 × 6-pounder + 4 × 4-pounder guns	90	John Halstead Coe

The Argentine commander was confident that, by using the surprise element, his more maneuverable ships could inflict damage and that he could escape before the Brazilian force could counterattack. However, he was unaware of the enemy's initial three-to-one advantage in terms of ships on the first day of battle (which escalated into a four-to-one advantage by the second day). Brown also underestimated the Brazilian fleet's ability to cut off any route of escaping in time. As a result, the battle was a two-day pouring of shells onto his men.

At night Brown left the anchorage with the Republica, Independencia, Congreso and Sarandí. The Brazilian watchman-corvette, Maceió, alerted the squadron using cannon and signal lamps. The corvette Liberal and the brigs of the second division, at anchor eight miles from the outer channel of the harbor, moved promptly. The Argentines dropped all their sails in search of the ocean. At two o'clock in the morning the Brazilians opened fire, making an effort to put the pursued Argentine ships between the line of Imperial brigs and the coast. The Maceió took care of the Congreso, which left the line of its own entering between the banks and seeking refuge in Ensenada. The Independencia and the Republica, turning in the same direction, ran aground between the ends of Palo Blanco and Confisco. The Sarandí sided with those, to join their fires to the defense. The artillery duel and the rescue and destruction maneuvers lasted for hours. By 7 P.M., Admiral Pinto Guedes' squadron appeared, but of all its vessels only the Pirajá, led by João das Botas, and the Independencia ou Morte, due to their smaller size, could approach the enemy. At night the wind changed, pushing six small schooners from Colonia capable of navigating the banks. The final attack on the stranded Republicans was prepared while the high-board ships closed the escape route. The schooners rounded up the Argentines, hitting them with cannon fire until 2 P.M, when they proceeded to board the Argentine ships. The Independencia lowered the flag, and the Republica, in spite of a well put up resistance, was overwhelmed. Admiral Brown, with a wound in his thigh, transferred to the Sarandí and returned to Buenos Aires.

== Aftermath ==
The losses in this battle, along with the loss of the large Argentinian vessel 25 de Mayo in the Battle of Quilmes (July 29–30, 1826), kept the Brazilian Navy in control of the River Plate. From that moment on, only raids against commerce ships could be carried out by the Argentine Navy, mostly from its Atlantic base at Carmen de Patagones, but no major operations to challenge the larger ships of the Brazilian Navy were possible. As the British military historian Brian Vale put it, "[...] Juncal had done little to push the Empire in the direction of peace. Now at Monte Santiago, two of Argentina's precious brigs-of-war had been destroyed and the cream of its Navy roundly defeated. The Brazilian Navy's overwhelming superiority at sea had been reasserted in a way which neither William Brown's audacity or Ramsay's newly purchased frigates could seriously challenge".

The war reached a standstill: the Argentine Army had greater control in the land operations, but lacked the means to expel the Brazilian Army from Colonia del Sacramento and Montevideo, the two largest cities of Uruguay (which would remain under Brazilian control throughout the whole conflict), and lacked larger ships to challenge the control of the river; at the same time, the losses sustained by the Brazilians during the previous battles discouraged them from extending the naval war into the interior rivers of Argentina, and the shallow waters discouraged the attempt of a direct attack against Buenos Aires. This situation continued until 1828 when the Preliminary Peace Convention was signed, by which the Cisplatina Province became the independent nation of Uruguay.

== Bibliography ==
- Donato, Hernâni (1987). Dicionário das Batalhas Brasileiras (in Portuguese). São Paulo: Editora Ibrasa.
- Garcia, Rodolfo (2012). Obras do Barão do Rio Branco VI: efemérides brasileiras (in Portuguese). Brasília: Fundação Alexandre de Gusmão. ISBN 978-85-7631-357-1.
- Scheina, Robert L. (2003). Latin America's Wars: The Age of the Caudillo, 1791-1899. Vol. I. Potomac Books Inc. ISBN 978-1-57488-450-0.
- Vale, Brian (2000). A War Betwixt Englishmen: Brazil Against Argentina on the River Plate. 1825-1830. London: I. B. Tauris. ISBN 1-86064-456-2.
