= Battle of Quilmes =

- Part of the Cisplatine War
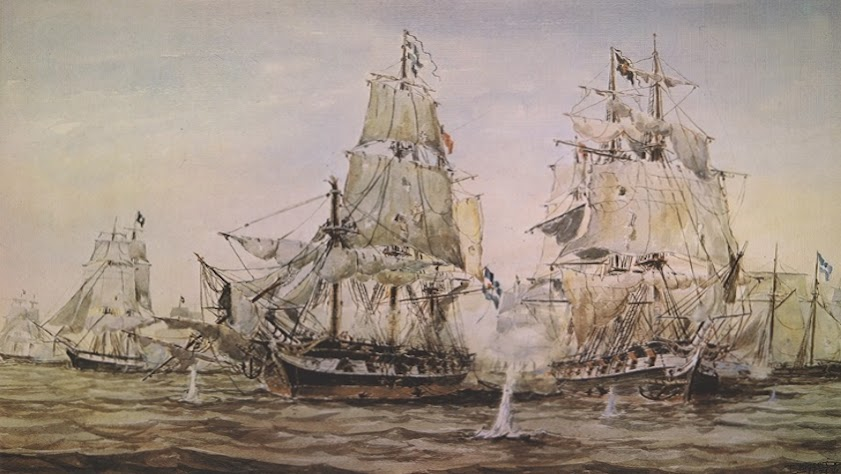
Date	29–30 July 1826
Location	Río de la Plata, Argentina 33°57′15″S 58°23′45″W
Result	Brazilian victory

Belligerents
Empire of Brazil	(Argentina) United Provinces

Commanders and leaders
James Norton	William Brown

Strength
Ships: 1 frigate 4 corvettes 3 brigs 4 schooners 3 gunboats Total guns: 208	Ships: 1 frigate 5 brigs 3 schooners 9 gunboats Total guns: 138

Casualties and losses
6 killed 24 wounded	1 frigate sunk 30–100 killed 70–100 wounded

The Battle of Quilmes took place between a fleet of the Imperial Brazilian Navy, commanded by British admiral James Norton and a fleet of the United Provinces of the Río de la Plata under the command of William Brown. The confrontations began at dawn on July 30, 1826 and lasted for three hours.

== Background ==
On the night of July 29, while an Argentine convoy of troops and military equipment carried out a crossing to the Banda Oriental, escorted by the Río de la Plata schooner that was commanded by captain Leonardo Rosales, admiral Brown, with a force integrated by the 25 de Mayo frigate (flagship), the Congreso, Independencia, Republica and General Balcarce brigs, the Sarandí schooner and other small ships in a total of 18, was in his usual base waiting for the convoy's arrival and left the port in an unsuccessful attempt to surprise the Brazilians.

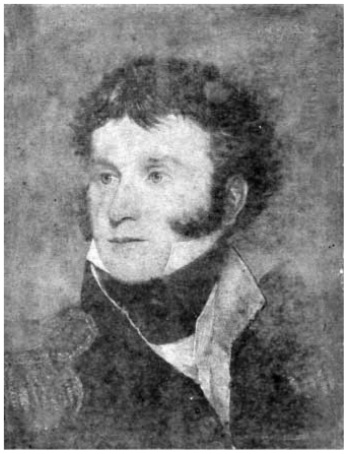
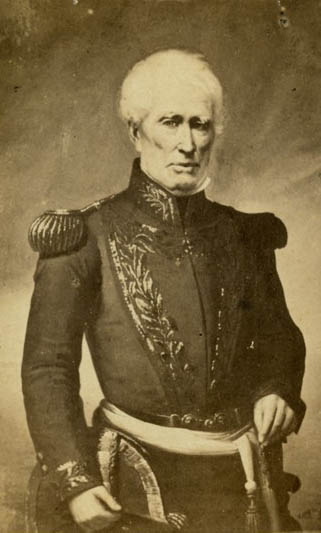
Admirals James Norton and William Brown

The Brazilian fleet, commanded by captain Norton, was composed of the Nichteroy frigate, the corvettes Liberal, Maria da Glória, Maceió and Itaparica, the brigs Pirajá, Caboclo and 29 de Agosto, the schooners Leal Paulistana, Dona Paula, Conceição and 7 de Março and a few gunboats, with a total of more than 200 guns. From 8 o'clock onwards, the fleet continued to sail until midnight, when it anchored to the east of the outer channel, near Ensenada waiting for the return of the convoy to attack it, which it finally did near the coast of Quilmes.

== Order of Battle ==
=== Empire of Brazil ===
Ships	Type	Guns
Nichteroy	Frigate	38
Maria da Glória	Corvette	30
Liberal	Corvette	22
Maceió	Corvette	20
Itaparica	Corvette	20
Caboclo	Brig	18
29 de Agosto	Brig	18
Pirajá	Brig	18
Leal Paulistana	Schooner	8
Conceição	Schooner	4
Dona Paula	Schooner	4
7 de Março	Schooner	3
9 de Janeiro	Gunboat	2
12 de Outubro	Gunboat	2
Itaparica	Gunboat	1

=== United Provinces of the Río de la Plata ===
Ships	Type	Guns
25 de Mayo	Frigate	36
Independencia	Brig	22
Congreso	Brig	18
Republica	Brig	16
Balcarce	Brig	14
Oriental-Argentino	Brig	13
Sarandí	Schooner	8
Río	Schooner	1
Pepa	Schooner	1
9 Gunboats	Gunboat	1 gun each

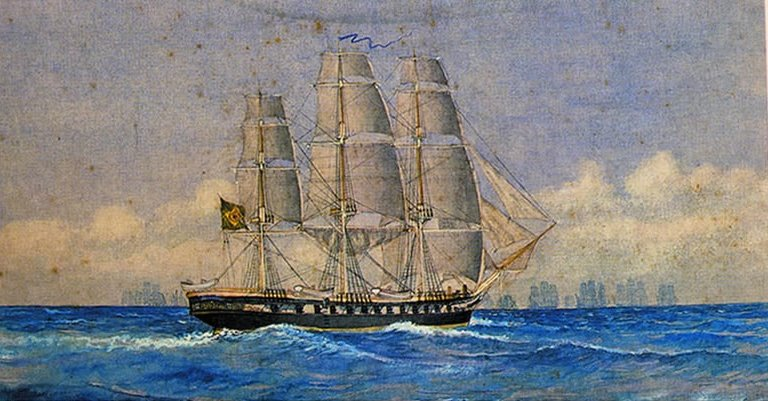
The Brazilian frigate Nichteroy

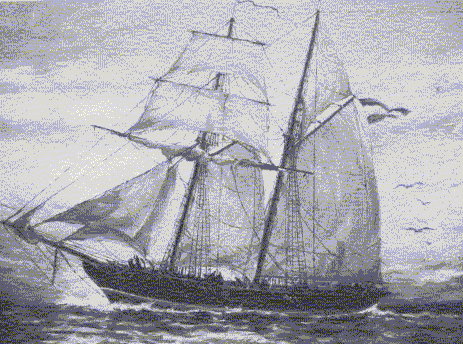
The Argentine schooner Sarandí

== Battle ==
As Scheina puts it:

"During the late evening of July 29, Brown, commanding eighteen small warships, once again slipped out of port and unsuccessfully attempted to surprise the Brazilians. The next day, as the Argentine squadron approached the Brazilians at a right angle, Norton split his force, catching the Argentine between two fires. Brown in the 25 de Mayo reversed course. Those ships in the Argentine van came under heavy fire. After three hours of fighting, the Argentine fleet escaped into shallow water. The 25 de Mayo, a floating wreck, was towed into Los Pozos and capsized in a strong southwester. The Brazilian lost six dead and twenty wounded; among this latter group was John Pascoe Grenfell who lost an arm. Argentine losses might have been as high as one hundred dead and one hundred wounded".
