= Surat Castle =

Castle in Gujarat, India

Surat Fort
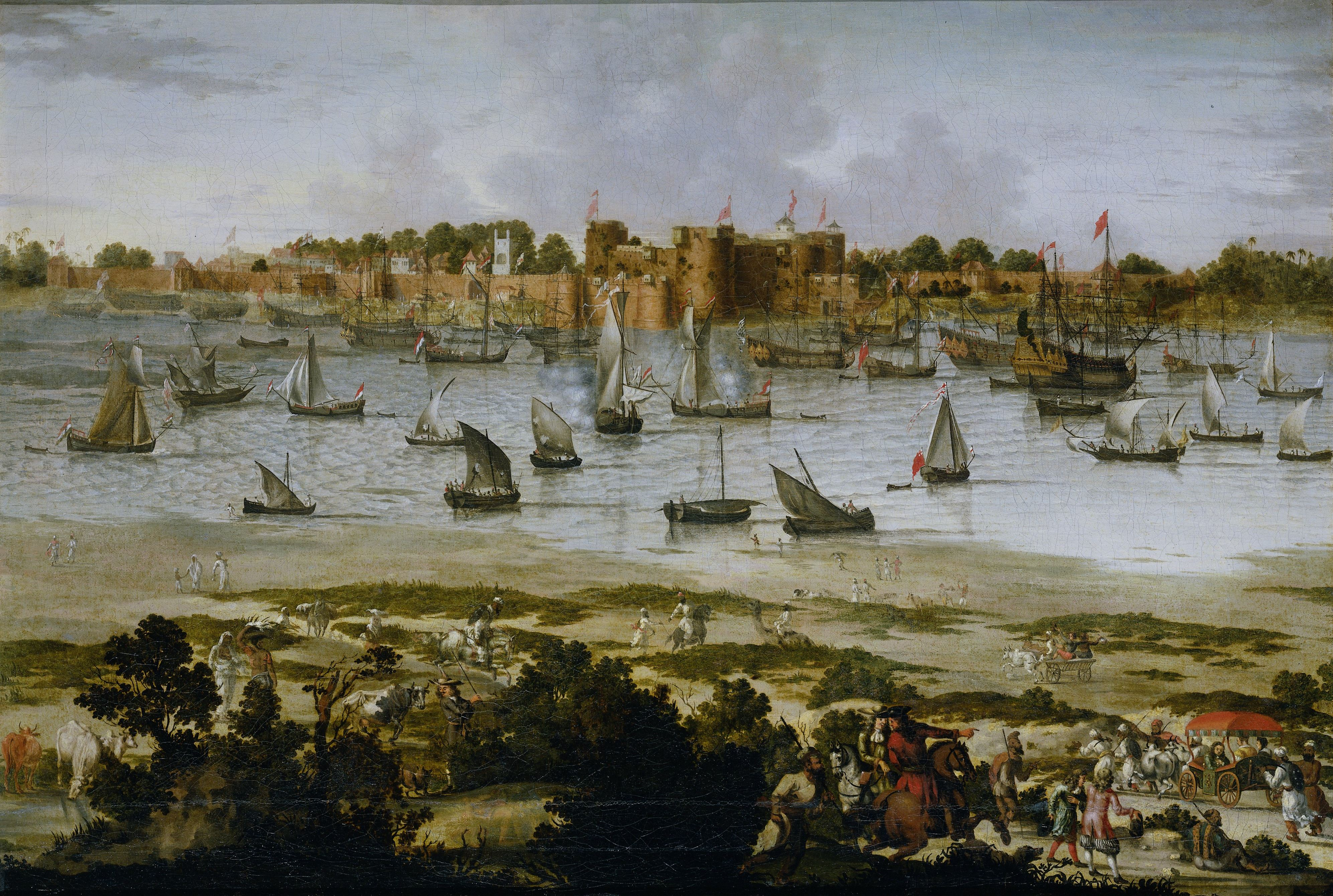
- The Surat Castle (center) in a c. 1670 painting
- Former names: The Old Fort of Surt, Surat Fort

General information
- Type: Castle
- Location: Chowk Bazaar, Surat, Gujarat, India, Chowk Bazaar, Surat, Gujarat, India
- Coordinates: 21.196220°N 72.817686°E
- Completed: 16th century
- Client: Gujarat Sultanate

Surat Castle, or Surat Fort, is a 16th-century structure in the city of Surat. The Ahmedabad king Sultan Mahmood-III (1538–1554) ordered its construction to defend the city from the frequent attacks that had devastated it. He entrusted the work to Safi Agha, a Turkish soldier who had been ennobled with the title of Khudawand Khan. The construction work of this castle was completed in the year 1546.

== History ==
Though in context of the identity of Surat in medieval times many views have been expressed by different historians, in all the historical narratives Surat has emerged as one of the major ports of international importance on the map of the world trade. A Portuguese traveller named Barbosa during his visit to Gujarat in 1514 described Surat as a city of great trade in all classes of merchandise, a very important seaport yielding a large revenue to the king, and frequented by many ships from Malabar and many other ports.

Shortly before Barbosa was in Gujarat, Surat is said to have been burnt by the Portuguese in 1512. Surat reportedly suffered from a wholly unprovoked, and piratical raid, in 1530, a second time by the Portuguese under the leadership of Antonio da Silvaria. Though the assailants were opposed by a guard of 300 horses and 10,000 foot, at the first charge the defenders fled, and the town was taken and burnt. As they were still at the war with the Gujarat King, the Portuguese again burnt Surat in 1531. The Ahmedabad king Sultan Mahmud Shah III (1538–1554), who was very much annoyed by these frequent destruction of Surat, ordered a very strong castle and endowed Safi Agha, a Turkish soldier who had been ennobled with the title of Khudawand Khan with a substantial budget for the work. Khudawand Khan initially selected three alternative sites for building the castle.

== Architecture ==
This historical castle was built on the bank of the river Tapi, on a land plot of nearly 1 acre. At each corner of the structure, there is a large round tower about 12.2m in height; the walls' curtains have the same height as the towers, with the thickness of the walls being 4.1 m. The top portions of the bastions are built in the Portuguese style. The king wanted to build the castle very strongly, where the stones were bonded or fastened together with iron strips, and the joints were filled in by pouring the melted lead.

There is a massive gate on the eastern wing of the castle, having strong door shutters furnished with protruding spikes at the exterior side, and a decorative architectural treatment at the interior side.

== See also ==
- List of tourist attractions in Surat
- List of forts in Gujarat
