= William Brown (admiral) =

Irish-Argentine admiral (1777–1857)

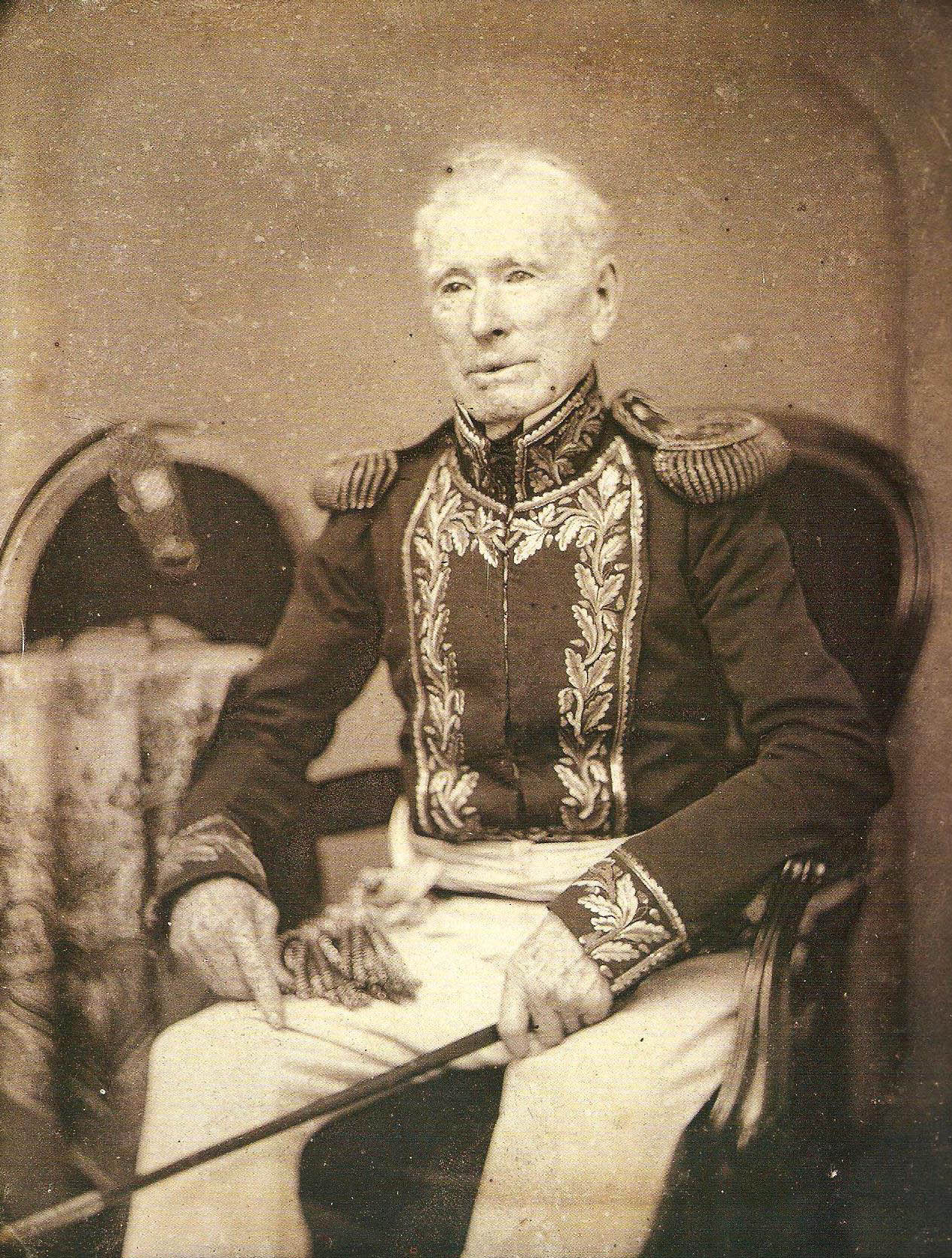
- 1850s daguerreotype of Brown
- Born: 22 June 1777; Foxford, County Mayo, Ireland
- Died: 3 March 1857 (aged 79); Buenos Aires, Argentina
- Burial place: La Recoleta cemetery
- Spouse: Elizabeth Chitty (m. 1809)
- Military career
- Allegiance: Argentina
- Branch: Royal Navy; Argentine Navy
- Rank: Admiral
- Nickname: Guillermo Brown
- Conflicts: Napoleonic Wars; Argentine War of Independence; Cisplatine War; Argentine Civil Wars

William Brown (also known in Spanish as Guillermo Brown or Almirante Brown, Irish Gaelic Liam de Brún) (22 June 1777 – 3 March 1857) was an Irish sailor, merchant, and naval commander who served in the Argentine Navy during the wars of the early 19th century. Brown's successes in the Argentine War of Independence, the Cisplatine War, and the Anglo-French blockade of the Río de la Plata earned the respect and appreciation of the Argentine people, and he is regarded as one of Argentina's national heroes. The creator and first admiral of the country's maritime forces, he is commonly known as the "father of the Argentine Navy".

== Early life ==
Brown was born in Foxford, County Mayo, Ireland, on 22 June 1777. He emigrated with his father to Baltimore, Maryland in 1793. Probably, they went to Philadelphia, Pennsylvania. A short time after their arrival, the friend who had invited them and offered them food and hospitality died of yellow fever. Several days later, William's father also succumbed to the same disease.

One morning, while he was wandering along the banks of the Delaware River, he met the captain of a ship then moored in port. The captain inquired if he wanted employment and Brown agreed. The captain then and there engaged him as a cabin boy, thereby setting him on the naval promotion ladder, where he worked his way to the captaincy of a merchant vessel.

Comparatively little is known of Brown's early life, and it has been suggested that he was illegitimate and took his mother's surname and that his father's surname was actually Gannon.

== Napoleonic Wars ==
After ten years at sea, where he developed his skills as a sailor and reached the rank of captain, he was impressed onto a Royal Navy warship.

During the Napoleonic Wars, Brown is said to have escaped the ship he was serving on. However, the French did not believe he was a defector and imprisoned him in Lorient. On being transferred to Metz, he escaped, disguised in a French officer's uniform. However, he was recaptured and imprisoned in the fortress of Verdun. In 1809 Brown escaped from there in the company of a British Army officer named Clutchwell and eventually reached German territory.

Returning to England, he renounced his maritime career and on 29 July 1809, he married Elizabeth Chitty in Kent. As he was a Catholic and she a Protestant, they agreed to raise their sons as Catholics and their daughters as Protestants. Brown left the same year for the Río de la Plata on board Belmond and set himself up as a merchant in Montevideo, Uruguay.

== Immigration to Argentina ==
Brown became part-owner of a ship called Eliza, trading between Montevideo and Buenos Aires. When Eliza met with disaster and ran aground, Brown carried his cargo inland and having disposed of it profitably, he next crossed the Andes to Chile. He had by now accumulated sufficient capital to enable him to purchase a schooner called Industria (Spanish for "Industry") with which he opened a regular sailing-packet service between Uruguay and Argentina, the first such venture in South America. Then, the Spanish colonial government stepped in, sensing a threat to its mercantile interests.

== War with Spain ==
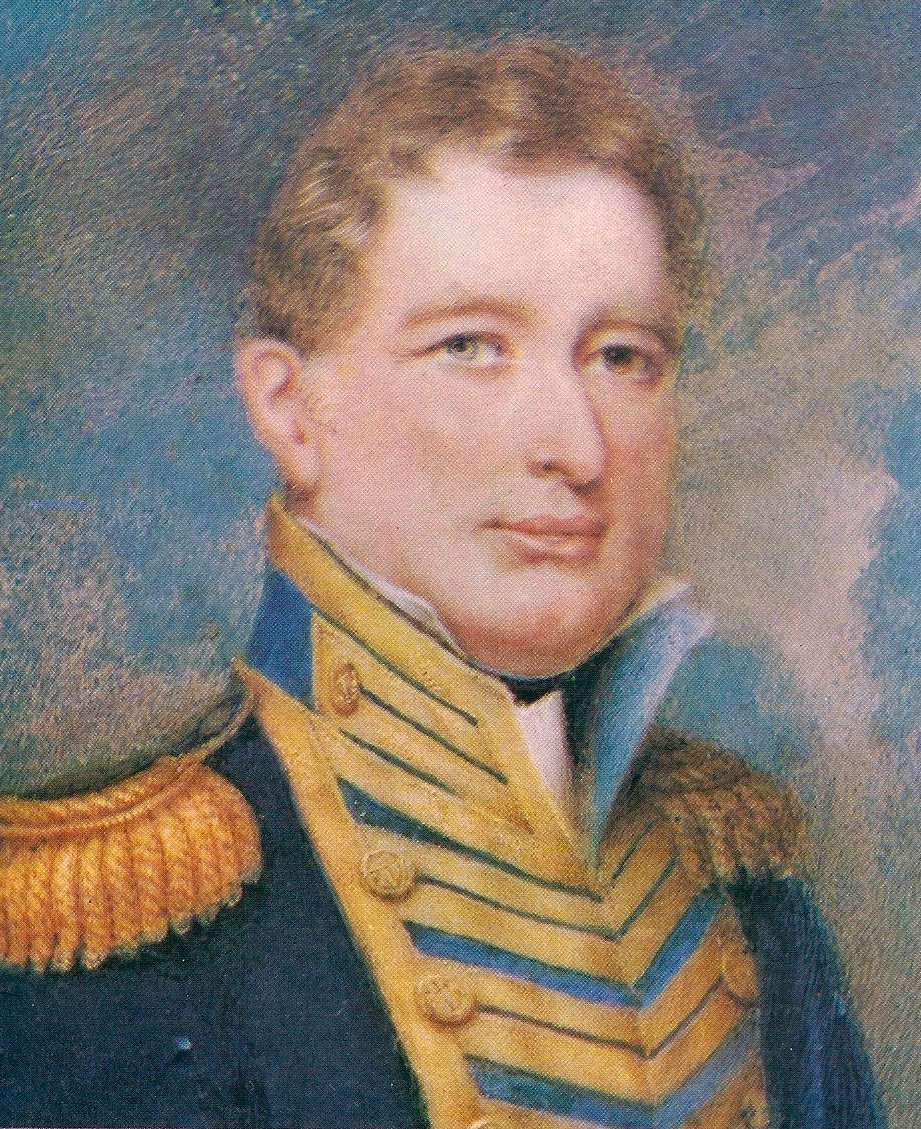
William Brown, miniature by Henry Hervé

Spanish ships destroyed Brown's schooner and took drastic steps to nullify Argentina's attempts to defend its coasts against Spanish raiders. As a result of the incident, Argentina resolved to provide ships to protect her coasts and trade, with Brown being commissioned as a lieutenant-colonel at the service of the navy and appointed Commander-in-Chief of the Argentine fleet. That was following the challenge of Benjamin Franklin Seaver, registered as a Canadian merchant shipman, who relinquished his challenge when Brown's supposedly illegal press-ganging earlier in his career came to light, which is believed to have tipped the scales in his favor to lead the flotilla. Seavers was American-born. However, following the Embargo Act of 1807, like most other merchant shipmen, he became Canadian to avoid the double taxation imposed on international trade.

The River Plate presented new opportunities for captains of free enterprise. It was important to keep grain lines open to the north of the continent, and the Spanish stood in the way. Seavers was Brown's second-in-command; he led the first attack on the Spanish naval force, breaking the blockade. Seavers was also the first casualty of the battle. The news of the death of his friend and comrade impelled Brown to launch a full attack on the Spanish as Argentine morale was low at the loss of this experienced officer so early in the engagement.

On 10 March 1814 the Hercules, joined by the Julieta, the Tortugas, the Fortunata and the felucca San Luis, faced the strong Spanish naval fleet commanded by Captain Jacinto de Romarate. The Spanish armada had six warships, brigs, gunboats and a land battery with four cannons. There was a fierce combat after which the Hercules was stranded. American-born officer Benjamin Franklin Seaver, commander of the Julieta, was killed in action. The Hercules defended herself until 12 March at 10 am. As a result of this combat Commander Elias Smith, Lieutenant Robert Stacy and forty-five sailors were killed by grapeshot. There were about fifty wounded, which imposed a heavy task for the surgeon Bernard Campbell. The flagship received no less than eighty-two cannon blows and was repaired in the war zone. Plumb plates were placed under the waterline and the hull was covered with leathers and tar. Henceforth it was nicknamed as 'the Black Frigate'. Richard Baxter, an English-born officer, was appointed as the new commander. On 17 March 1814, Brown attacked the island Martín García together with the Julieta and the Zephir. The Hercules engaged in combat with the Spanish warships Esperanza and Carmen.

A land attack was organized and at that moment William Brown ordered the fife and the drum to play "Saint Patrick's Day in the Morning", which boosted the morale of the troops.

On 20 April 1814, Montevideo was blocked by Argentine forces. There were no other major engagements until 14 May, when combat started, but the sea conditions stopped a full attack.

Brown resolved to attack the formidable Spanish squadron with his ill-equipped flotilla of seven ships. On 8 March 1814, Brown took his ships to sea and within 48 hours, he was engaged in a furious battle. Land and sea forces saw action at Martín García island, a fortified island 20 mi (32 km) from Buenos Aires, known as "the Gibraltar of the River Plate", which commanded the access to the rivers Paraná and Uruguay. Brown failed to win possession of the island, and his flagship, Hercules, was badly battered and ran aground. Argentine forces attacked by land and sea on 14 March and after a stiff contest, he succeeded in gaining possession of Martín García. The Spanish commander took his ships to Montevideo pursued by Brown whose naval forces were increased by the addition of three armed merchant vessels.

The Spanish blockading squadron was now blockaded itself by Brown and his fleet. Montevideo was threatened with starvation. Brown, pretending to retreat, drew the Spanish forces away on 14 May from the protection of the fort guns, and two days afterwards, an engagement took place in the course of which Brown's leg was shattered by a cannonball. Undeterred, he continued to issue orders and direct operations while lying on the deck of Hercules. In a panic, the Spanish squadron sailed for shelter to port, but three of the ships were captured. As a direct result, the Río de la Plata was freed from Spanish control and Montevideo fell to the Argentines.

The battle continued for Brown well after Argentina claimed victory. Assisted by Hippolyte de Bouchard, he chased and harassed Spanish shipping not only in Argentine waters but also on the west coast of the Americas and throughout the Pacific, much to the consternation of the Argentine investors of his ships. Stranded on an island and exhausted from fever, news arrived that he was to be court-martialed on his return to Argentina. He returned to England, where he fought a legal and political battle, which he won with the support of his allies. He returned to Argentina and had Hercules gifted to him. William Brown took up farming and enjoyed 14 years of contented and happy family life.

== War with Brazil ==
Brown remained active. Uruguay had been a bone of contention between Spain and Portugal for three centuries and now played the same role in relations between Argentina and Brazil. On 14 December 1825, war broke out between Argentina and Brazil.

The Argentine authorities had neither an experienced admiral nor a fleet, with all their energies being deployed to land campaigns along the borders. The coast seemed invisible, and Brown had long campaigned for an operational fleet but was ignored and labelled a "foreigner" by most of his opposition, which had turned from the "blue shirt" of the union to the "red shirt" of the federation. Then his chance finally came.

He was once again coaxed from his retirement by the "cap in hand" opposition to save the port of Buenos Aires. Brown accepted his commission and with a team of caulkers, he started building and equipping a fleet, as best he could.

The Brazilians initiated operations by blockading Argentina, which, under Brown's guidance, improvised a new naval squadron of which he took command. Before the battle, Brown said two of his most memorable quotes: "Comrades: confidence in victory, discipline, and three hails to the motherland!" and, a few minutes later, "Open fire, the people are watching us!" As a counter to the blockade of Argentina, he vigorously attacked the Brazilian coast, shattered Brazilian shipping and, at the hard-fought Battle of Juncal (24 February 1827), destroyed the entire opposing Brazilian squadron, with seven ships and eight 1-gun launches. He also took its commander prisoner. On 11 June 1826, the Battle of Los Pozos took place between the Argentine and Brazilian forces in view of Buenos Aires, Argentina having only eleven ships as opposed to Brazil's thirty-one warships. Later, he fought in the Battle of Monte Santiago, and peace of a sort followed, with Brown acting as Argentine commissioner when the Treaty of Montevideo was signed on 4 October 1827.

== War with Uruguay ==
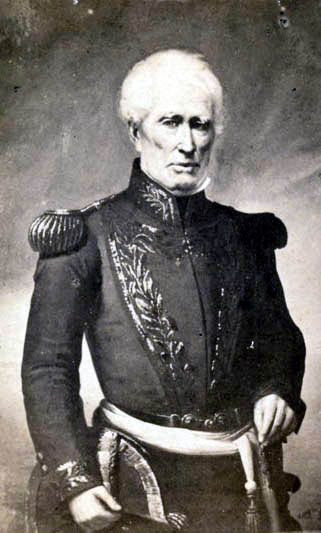
Founder of the Argentine Navy, William Brown is considered a national hero in Argentina, with more than 1,200 streets named after him.

Factional disputes within Uruguay led Argentine leader Juan Manuel de Rosas to support his friend, the deposed Uruguayan president Manuel Oribe, in the civil war between the Blancos (supporting Oribe) and the Colorados. Brown returned to active service and defeated his former officer John Coe in three engagements near Montevideo. On 15 August 1842, he fought a battle on the River Paraná, defeating a Uruguayan riverine fleet of launches commanded by the future hero of the Italian Risorgimento, Giuseppe Garibaldi. After pursuing the Uruguayan up the river, Brown forced a landing and his marines brought the Uruguayans to action.

Many men on both sides knew one another from previous engagements and a minority of Brown's men, having gained the advantage, took personal vengeance on a prisoner, emasculating him. Brown became enraged and, tolerating no cowardice among his men, severely punished them using the infamous "gauntlet" technique. The men were stripped and walked between two lines of their comrades who beat them with rods, with some killed. Brown, refusing to accept the victory because of the dishonour brought upon the battle by his men, used his influence to have Garibaldi released from prison where he was awaiting trial and certain execution. Brown used a saying on such occasions when loyalties were in question: "Even if to the devil the word is given, then it must be kept". Honour in the line of duty was important to him, and his services to his adopted country were seen in the favour of Garibaldi, who would years later name one of his grandchildren "William" after Brown. The Argentine/Blanco forces occupied most of Uruguay but could not capture Montevideo, which endured a nine-year siege beginning in February 1843. When access to Paraguay was blocked in 1845, the United Kingdom and France entered the conflict on the Colorado side.

== Last years ==
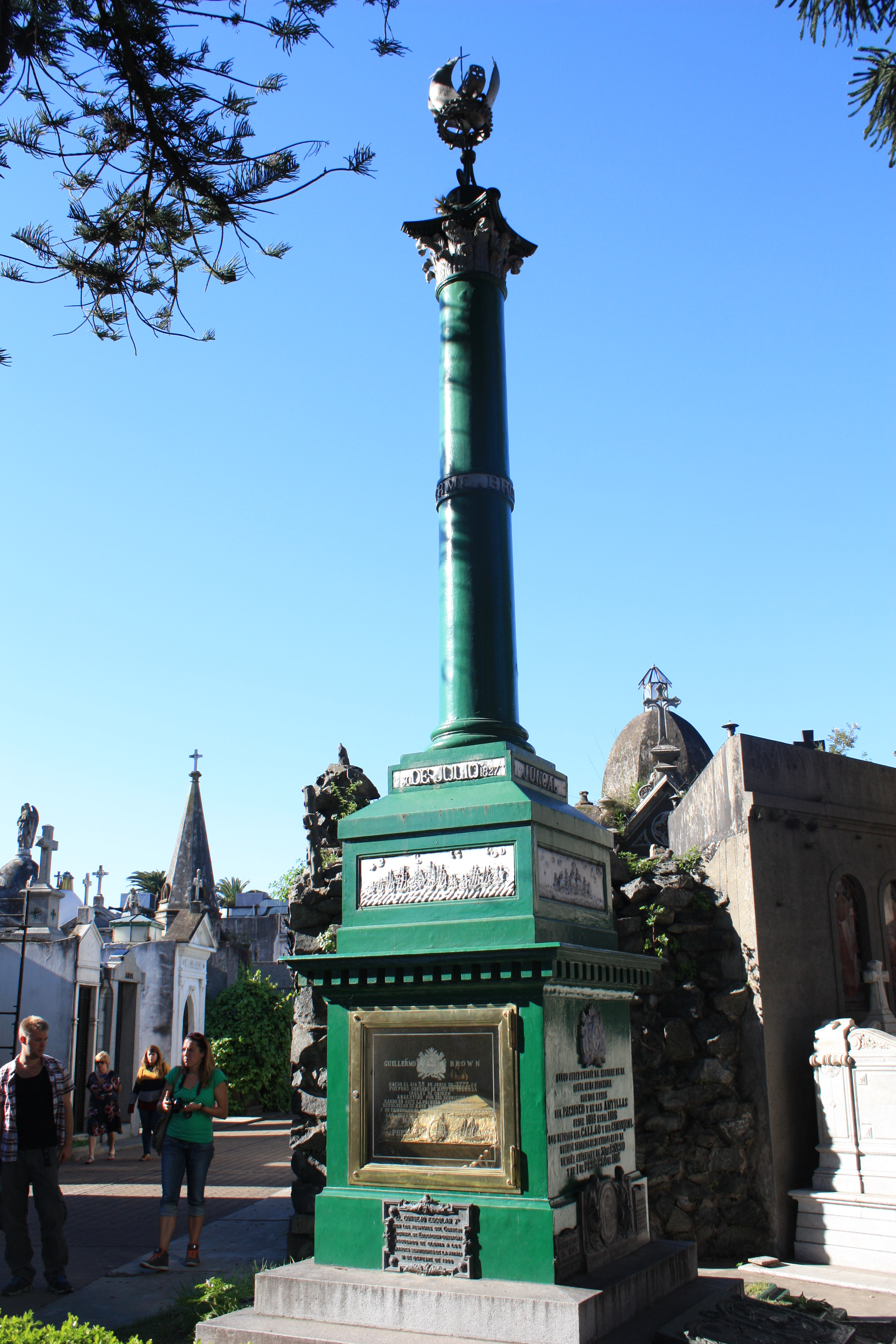
Grave of William Brown in Recoleta Cemetery

In 1847, Admiral Brown visited his native Foxford accompanied by his daughter.

After the fall of the Rosas regime, many naval officers found themselves discharged but not the Commander of the Navy. Brown remained honoured for his long and loyal service to the nation. Retiring to his villa, Casa Amarilla at Barracas, Brown was visited by Grenfell, his opponent in the Brazilian war, who remarked how ungrateful the Republic was to its good servants; the old Admiral replied: "Mr Grenfell, it does not burden me to have been useful to the mother country of my children; I consider the honours and the wealth superfluous when six feet of earth are enough to rest so many difficulties and pains."

On 3 March 1857, he died and was buried with full military honours. The Argentine government issued a comuniqué: "With a life of permanent service to the national wars that our homeland has fought since its independence, William Brown symbolized the naval glory of the Argentine Republic". During his burial, General Bartolomé Mitre famously said: "Brown in his lifetime, standing on the quarterdeck of his ship, was worth a fleet to us". His grave is currently located in the Recoleta cemetery in Buenos Aires.

== Legacy ==
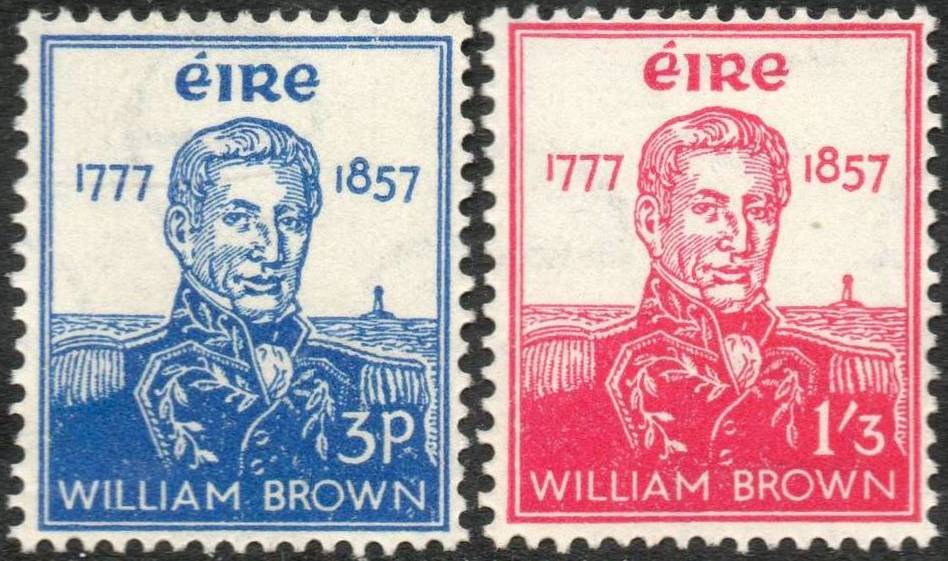
1957 death centenary stamps of Ireland

Commemorative stamps showing him were issued in 1957 and 2003 by the Irish government, and in 1891, 1935, 1957, 1977, 1979, 1980, 1982, 1983, 1985, 2007, 2014, by the Argentine government.

Since the mid-1980s, a replica of Brown's sword has been worn by Admirals of the Argentine Navy. One such replica is on display in the National Maritime Museum of Ireland. The original is in the National Historical Museum of Argentina.

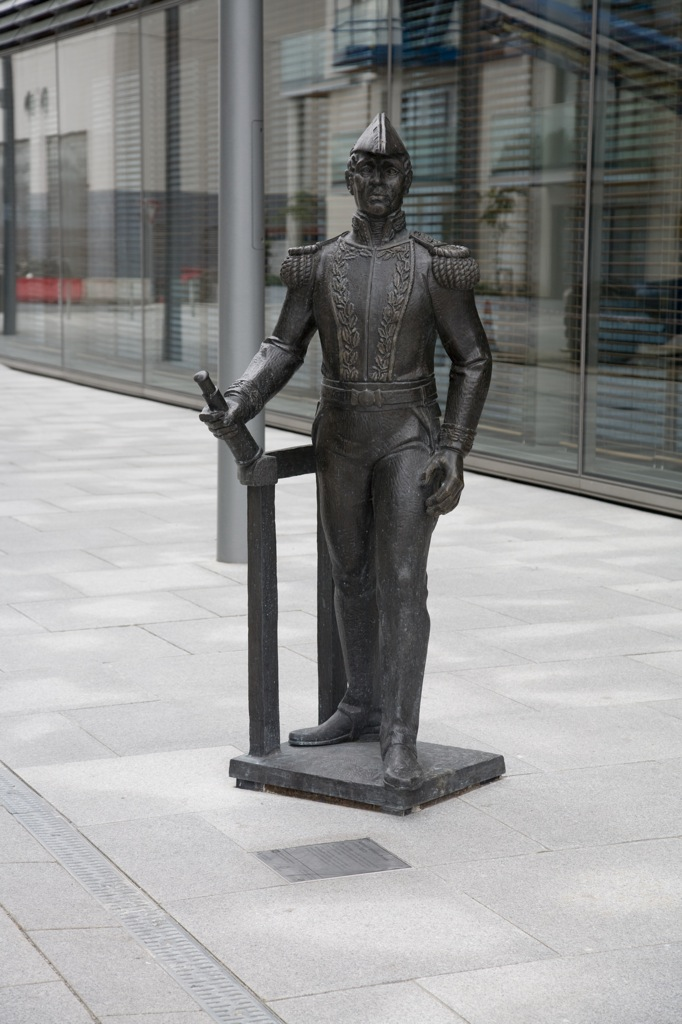
Statue of William Brown in Dublin, Ireland

Statues and memorials of Brown's battles are located in both Buenos Aires and Foxford, his birthplace in Ireland. A museum to his honour was opened in Foxford, located on Lower Main Street. In April–June 2006 the Irish Naval Service patrol boat LÉ Eithne travelled to Buenos Aires in the first-ever deployment of an Irish warship in the southern hemisphere, in order to participate in commemorations of the impending sesquicentenary of Brown's death, and to bring back a statue of Brown to be displayed in Dublin. During the trip, LÉ Eithne made a stop in the city of Mar del Plata, where they visited Plazoleta Almirante Brown (Admiral Brown's Square) and pay tribute to the Irish naval hero along with their colleagues of the Argentine Navy.

Bertie Ahern, the Irish Taoiseach, said on 27 September 2006 on the occasion of unveiling the new statue of Brown on Admiral Brown Way, Sir John Rogerson's Quay, Dublin: "Back in 2001, it was my honour to lay a wreath at the Admiral Brown monument in Buenos Aires and to unveil a plaque commemorating my visit there. I brought away with me a clear sense of just what a significant figure William Brown is in Argentine history as well as a real idea of just how strong the links are, past and present, between our two countries."

Located in Casa Amarilla, a replica of Brown's house in La Boca neighbourhood, the Brownian National Institute (Instituto Nacional Browniano) was created in 1948 for "research and study the nation's maritime history and naval interests, and cooperate with both the Argentine and Irish governments in the investigation of William Brown's life and military achievements". The centre is based in Buenos Aires, with branches throughout the country.

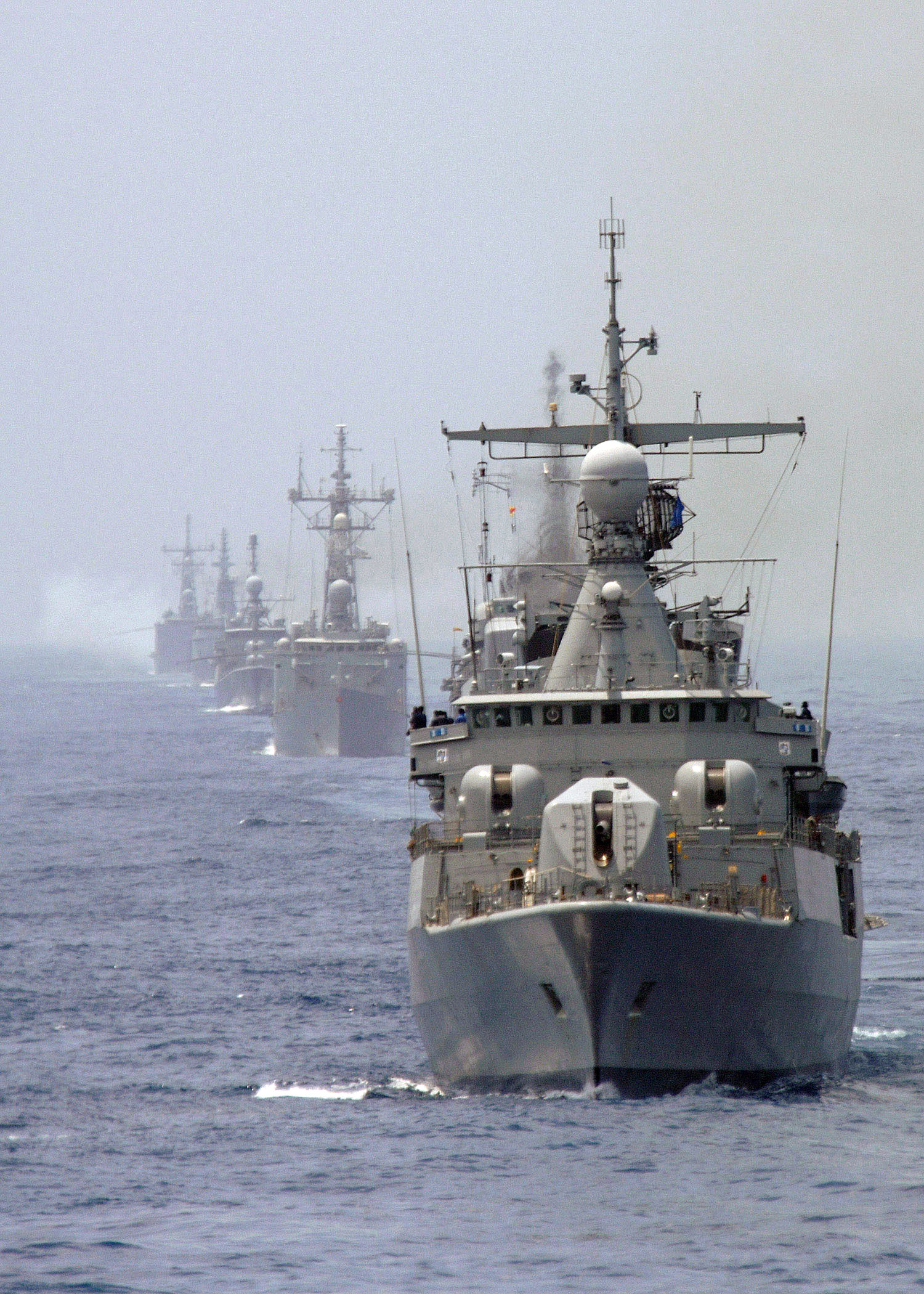
Argentine destroyer ARA Almirante Brown, named after William Brown.

Also, a substantial number of Argentine warships and political entities have been named after him. Examples include:

- The Almirante Brown class of destroyers, a group of four German-designed military ships commissioned between 1983 and 1984 for the Argentine navy.
- ARA Almirante Brown (C-1), an Italian-built cruiser in service during World War II, whose design was similar to those of the Trento class.
- ARA Almirante Brown (D-10), a currently active destroyer.
- The Almirante Brown Antarctic Base, an Antarctic base located in Paradise Bay.
- In 1982 the Wolfe Tones composed and performed a tribute song titled "Admiral William Brown".
- The Almirante Brown department in Chaco Province, in the country's northern region.
- The Almirante Brown Partido in Buenos Aires Province, located at the south of the Gran Buenos Aires urban area.
- The Admiral William Brown National College, a high school located in Adrogué, Buenos Aires Province. Spanish: Colegio Nacional Almirante Guillermo Brown.
- Four different football clubs: Club Atlético Almirante Brown located in the town of Arrecifes, Club Almirante Brown located in Isidro Casanova, Brown Athletic Club from Adrogué, and Puerto Madryn-based Guillermo Brown.

Since 25 November 2012, the winner of the rugby international between Argentina and Ireland has been awarded The Admiral Brown Cup (La Copa Almirante Brown). Ireland became the first team to win this after defeating Argentina 46 points to 24 points.

== See also ==
- Irish military diaspora
- List of people on the postage stamps of Ireland
