= List of people with surname Lynch =

Lynch is a surname of English and Irish origin.

== A ==
- Alastair Lynch (born 1968), Australian football player
- Albert Lynch (1851–1912), Peruvian painter
- Allen Lynch (born 1945), American Medal of Honor recipient
- Angela Lynch (died 2007), Mayor of Galway
- Annie Lynch (1864–1938), Irish-Australian religious, nurse, hospital administrator
- Arnold Lynch (1914–2004) English electrical engineer

== B ==
- Becky Lynch (born 1987), ring name of Irish professional wrestler Rebecca Quin
- Benito Lynch (1885–1951), Argentine writer of Irish descent
- Benjamin Lynch (born 2002), Irish-Canadian freestyle skier
- Benny Lynch (1913–1946), Scottish boxer
- Bernárd J. Lynch (born 1947), American Roman Catholic priest and psychotherapist
- Blake Lynch (born 1997), American football player
- Brian Lynch (basketball) (born 1978), American basketball player
- Brian Lynch (musician) (born 1956), American jazz musician
- Brian Lynch (public servant) (born 1936), New Zealander diplomat
- Brian Lynch (American writer) (born 1973), American writer, director, and actor
- Bray Lynch (born 2004), American football player

== C ==
- Carolyn Lynch Carolyn Hoff Lynch (1946–2015), American philanthropist
- Cedric Lynch electrical engineer and inventor of the Lynch motor
- Charles Lynch (judge) (1736–1796), Virginia militia officer, possible inspiration for the word "lynching"
- Charles Lynch (politician) (1783–1853), United States politician
- Christopher Lynch (businessman), Australian businessman
- Clifford Lynch (1954–2025), American computer scientist and director of the Coalition for Networked Information
- Cynthia Lynch (born 1971), wrestler

== D ==
- Damian Lynch (born 1979), Irish association footballer
- Dan Lynch (politician) (1929–2026), American politician from Nebraska
- Daniel Lynch IV (born 1996), American baseball player
- Daniel Lynch (basketball) (1916–1981), former basketball coach at St. Francis College
- Dave Lynch (1902–1958), Australian rules football player
- David Lynch (1946–2025), American film director
- Derek Lynch (born 1971), Canadian racing car driver
- Derik Lynch, Australian artist and filmmaker, writer-director and subject of the 2022 film Marungka Tjalatjunu (Dipped in Black)
- Douglas Lynch (disambiguation), several people
- Dustin Lynch (born 1985), American singer-songwriter
- Drew Lynch (born 1991), American comedian

== E ==
- Edele Lynch (born 1979), Irish singer of B*Witched
- Edward Lynch (disambiguation), several people
- Eliza Lynch, mistress of Francisco Solano López, Paraguayan dictator
- Eric the Midget (Eric Lynch), American radio personality
- Ernesto Guevara De La Serna y Lynch, full name of Che Guevara
- Enrique Lynch Arribálzaga (1856–1935), Argentine zoologist, political activist, administrator, and writer
- Enrique Lynch del Solar, Modernist artist from Chile
- Estanislao Lynch (1793–1849), Argentine naval officer
- Evanna Lynch (born 1991), Irish actress, played Luna Lovegood in the Harry Potter films

== F ==
- Finbar Lynch (born 1959), Irish actor
- Fionán Lynch (1889–1966), Irish politician

== G ==
- Genevieve Springston Lynch, a.k.a. Gene Lynch, (1891–1960), American artist
- Geoffrey Lynch, aka Geffere Lynch, 4th Mayor of Galway, fl. 1488–1489
- George Lynch (basketball), retired American professional basketball player
- George Lynch (musician) (born 1954), American guitarist with the heavy metal band Dokken
- George Lynch (race car driver) (1918–1997)
- George Edward Lynch (1917–2003), American Catholic bishop
- Gerard Lynch (Irish politician) (1931–2025), Irish politician
- Gerard E. Lynch (born 1951), American federal judge
- Grayston Lynch (1923–2008), American soldier and CIA officer

== H ==
- Henry Lynch (1822–1906), founder Lynch Family bellringers of Australia
- Henry Finnis Blosse Lynch, British traveller, businessman, and politician
- Henry T. Lynch, American physician and cancer researcher
- Holly Lynch (actress), American actress and model
- Holly Lynch, British politician

== J ==
- Jack Lynch (1917–1999), sports star and fourth Taoiseach of the Republic of Ireland
- Jack Lynch (baseball) (1857–1923), American baseball player
- James Lynch (disambiguation), several people
- Jane Lynch (born 1960), American actress, best known for her work on the TV show Glee
- Janelle Lynch, American photographer
- Jarvis Lynch (born 1933), American general
- Jay Lynch (1945–2017), American cartoonist
- Jay Lynch (footballer) (born 1993), English footballer
- Jennifer Lynch (born 1968), American film director
- Jessica Lynch (born 1983), American soldier and prisoner of war
- Joe Lynch (actor) (1925–2001), Irish actor
- Joe Lynch (boxer) (1898–1965), American boxer
- Joel Lynch (born 1987), English footballer
- John Carroll Lynch (born 1963), American actor and film director
- John H. Lynch (born 1952), American politician and governor
- John Lynch (actor), actor from Northern Ireland
- John Lynch (American football) (born 1971), American football player
- John R. Lynch (1847–1939), black U.S. politician after the American Civil War
- Justo Pastor Lynch (1755–1830), Argentine landowner

== K ==
- Kathleen Lynch (disambiguation), several people
- Kathy Lynch (born 1957), New Zealand mountain biker
- Keavy Lynch (born 1979), Irish singer of B*Witched
- Kelly Lynch (born 1959), American actress
- Ken Lynch (1910–1990), American actor
- Kenny Lynch (1938–2019), English singer and actor
- Kevin Lynch (hunger striker), Irish republican
- Kevin A. Lynch (1918–1984), American urban planner and author
- Kevin G. Lynch, Canadian civil servant

== L ==
- Lashana Lynch (born 1987), British actress
- Liam Lynch (Irish Republican) (1893–1923), Irish general
- Liam Lynch (musician) (born 1970), musician, puppeteer, and director
- Loretta Lynch (born 1959), 83rd Attorney General of the United States
- Louis Lynch (born 1955), American harpist and composer
- Lydia Lynch, immunologist

== M ==
- Mark Lynch (English footballer) (born 1981)
- Mark Lynch (Gaelic footballer) (born 1986)
- Marshawn Lynch (born 1986), American football running back
- Marta Lynch (1925–1985), Argentine writer
- Michael Lynch (disambiguation), several people
- Michelle Lynch (born 1975), cricketer from New Zealand.

== N ==
- Nancy Lynch, professor at MIT
- Nnenna Lynch, American distance runner
- Nicolás Barrios-Lynch, Argentine pioneer of the Rural Libraries movement
- Noel Lynch, British politician

== O ==
- Karl O'Lynch von Town, Austrian artist
- Orlanda Lynch, Surinamese track and field athlete
- Owen Lynch, American anthropologist specialising in Dalit studies

== P ==
- Patricio Lynch, Chilean rear-admiral
- Patrick Lynch (disambiguation)
- Patsy Lynch, American photographer
- Paxton Lynch, American football player
- Peirce Lynch, first Mayor of Galway
- Peter Lynch (born 1944), investor

== Q ==
- Quinten Lynch, Australian Football player for the West Coast Eagles

== R ==
- Rachael Lynch (born 1986), Australian field hockey player
- Ray Lynch (1943–2025), American musician and composer
- Ray Lynch (American football) (1894–1965), American football player and coach
- Rayleen Lynch (born c. 1946), Australian basketball player
- Reggie Lynch (born 1994), American basketball player in the Israeli Basketball Premier League
- Regina Lynch-Hudson, American publicist and historian
- Richard Lynch (disambiguation), several people
- Riker Lynch, American actor and musician
- Robert Clyde Lynch, American physician who developed the Lynch operation
- Rocky Lynch, American musician
- Ron Lynch (disambiguation), several people
- Ronan Lynch, American musician
- Ross Lynch, American actor and musician
- Rydel Lynch, American musician

== S ==
- Sandra Lynch (born 1946), first woman judge on the United States Court of Appeals for the First Circuit
- Scott Lynch (author) (born 1978), American fantasy author
- Sean Lynch (disambiguation), various people
- Shane Lynch (born 1976), Irish singer of Boyzone
- Simon Lynch (footballer), Canadian soccer player
- Stan Lynch, drummer for Tom Petty and The Heartbreakers
- Stephen Lynch (English cricketer) (born 1951)
- Stephen Lynch (New Zealand cricketer) (born 1976)
- Stephen Lynch (musician) (born 1971), American singer/comedian
- Stephen Lynch (politician) (born 1955), American congressman
- Stephen Andrew Lynch (1882–1969), American businessman
- Steve Lynch, guitarist with the American band Autograph
- Susan Lynch, actress from Northern Ireland
- Susan Lynch (pediatrician), First Lady of New Hampshire
- Sybil Lynch, American singer

== T ==
- Thaddeus Lynch (1901–1966), Irish politician
- Thomas Lynch (disambiguation)

== V ==
- Valeria Lynch (born 1952), Argentine singer

== W ==
- Wanita Lynch (born 1958), Australian gymnast
- William Lynch (Lynch law), Virginia citizen
- William F. Lynch (1801–1865), American naval officer
- William Francis Lynch (1839–1876), US Army brigadier general

== See also ==
- Bet Lynch, fictional character in the British soap opera Coronation Street
- Sir Henry Lynch-Blosse, 7th Baronet (1749–1788), Irish politician
- Angela Lynch-Lupton (died 2007), twice mayor of Galway
- Lynch-Staunton, a list of people with the surname
- Anna Lynch-Robinson, costume designer
