= Diella =

Diella may refer to:

- Diella, Burkina Faso, village in Boulgou Province
- Diella (AI system), cabinet-level AI system in Albania
- Diella, 1596 poem collection attributed to Richard Linche

== See also ==
- Diela
