= Robert Lynch =

Robert Lynch may refer to:

- Robert Nugent Lynch (born 1941), bishop of St. Petersburg, Florida
- Robert Clyde Lynch (1880–1931), American physician
- Robert Lynch (Wisconsin politician) (1881–1959), baseball player and Wisconsin state assemblyman
- Robert L. Lynch, American arts administrator
- Robert M. Lynch (born 1976), American businessman
- Bob Lynch (musician) (1935–1982), Irish folk musician and member of the Dubliners
- Bob Lynch (footballer) (born 1944), Australian rules footballer
- Robert Lynch (Auckland cricketer) (born 1982), New Zealand cricketer
- Robert Lynch (Wellington cricketer) (1856–1938), New Zealand cricketer
- Rob Lynch (born 1986), English singer-songwriter and teacher
