= Justo Pastor Lynch =

Argentine landowner (1755-1830)

Justo Pastor Lynch Galayn
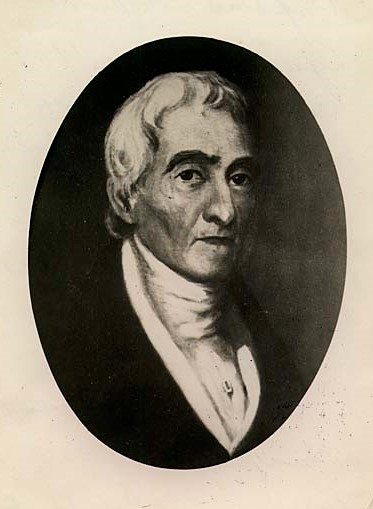
- portrait of Justo Pastor Lynch

Personal details
- Born: 9 August 1755 Buenos Aires, Viceroyalty of the Río de la Plata
- Died: 8 May 1830 (aged 74) Buenos Aires, Argentina
- Occupation: Government
- Profession: Accountant
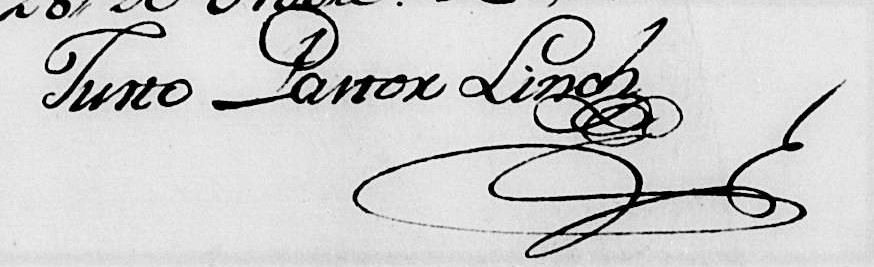
- Signature

Justo Pastor Lynch (1755–1830) was an Argentine landowner. He was born in Buenos Aires on the Lynch family "estancia", a ranch by the River de la Plata. He was the eldest surviving son of Patrick Lynch of Lydican Castle in Claregalway Ireland, and Rosa de Galaya de la Camera. At times, his name was recorded as Pastorin or Pastorino Lynch in reference to the large pastoral land owned by his family dedicated to horses and livestock.

== Descendants ==
Justo's fortune was one of the largest in the region, properties, and business he received from his family, in addition, he married the Spanish heiress Ana Bernardo Roo (d.1836), who doubled the extent and value of his properties; consequently, his sons enjoyed a wealthy life like no other Irish immigrants in the region.

His eldest son Patricio (Patrick) Lynch, born 1789, set up a shipping company. He owned the frigate, Heroína, which was involved in a claim of possession of the Falkland Islands in 1820. Patricio Lynch is the great great grandfather of Che Guevara.

Another son Estanislao Lynch, born 1793, fought in the Argentine independence war with the grade of colonel. On 2 January 1817 the Buenos Aires city council appointed Estanislao as the mayor of Barracas.
