= Patrick Lynch =

Patrick Lynch may refer to:

- Patrick Neeson Lynch (1817–1882), Catholic bishop during the American Civil War
- Patrick Lynch (Roman Catholic bishop) (born 1947), Irish Roman Catholic bishop
- Patrick Lynch (Rhode Island attorney general) (born 1965), former Attorney General of Rhode Island
- Patrick Lynch (Irish attorney general) (1866–1947), Irish politician
- Patrick J. Lynch (biomedical illustrator) (born 1953), American author and artist
- Patrick Lynch (Argentina) (1715–1789), Irish ancestor of Che Guevara, born in Galway, emigrated to Argentina
- Patrick Lynch (Australian politician) (1867–1944), Senator
- Patrick Lynch (economist) (1917–2001), professor of economics at University College Dublin and chairman of Aer Lingus
- Patrick Lynch (Galway) (fl. 1659–1673), healed by a miracle
- P. J. Lynch (Patrick James Lynch, born 1962), Irish artist and children's book illustrator
- Patrick Lynch, a pseudonym for the authors Philip Sington and Gary Humphreys
- Patrick Lynch (police officer) (born 1964), head of the Patrolmen's Benevolent Association of the City of New York
- Patrick Lynch (educationalist), New Zealand educationalist
- Patrick Lynch, co-founder of Law School Transparency
- Pat Lynch (singer) (1933–2018), Irish showband singer
- Paddy Lynch (born 2000), Irish Gaelic footballer
- Patrick Lynch (Gaelic teacher) (c.1750s-1838), Irish song collector with Edward Bunting

== See also ==
- John M. Lynch (John M. "Pat" Lynch), Mayor of Somerville, Massachusetts and Chair of the Massachusetts Democratic Party
