= Puelche River =

Coordinates: 35°49′46″S 70°42′54″W

The Puelche River (Spanish: Río Puelche) is a natural water course that originates at the Pichi Trolón Pass, on the international border between Chile and Argentina of the Maule Region, and flows in a general west direction until it ends at the Maule River.
