= Argentines in Chile =

Ethnic group in Chile

Argentines in Chile Argentinos en Chile
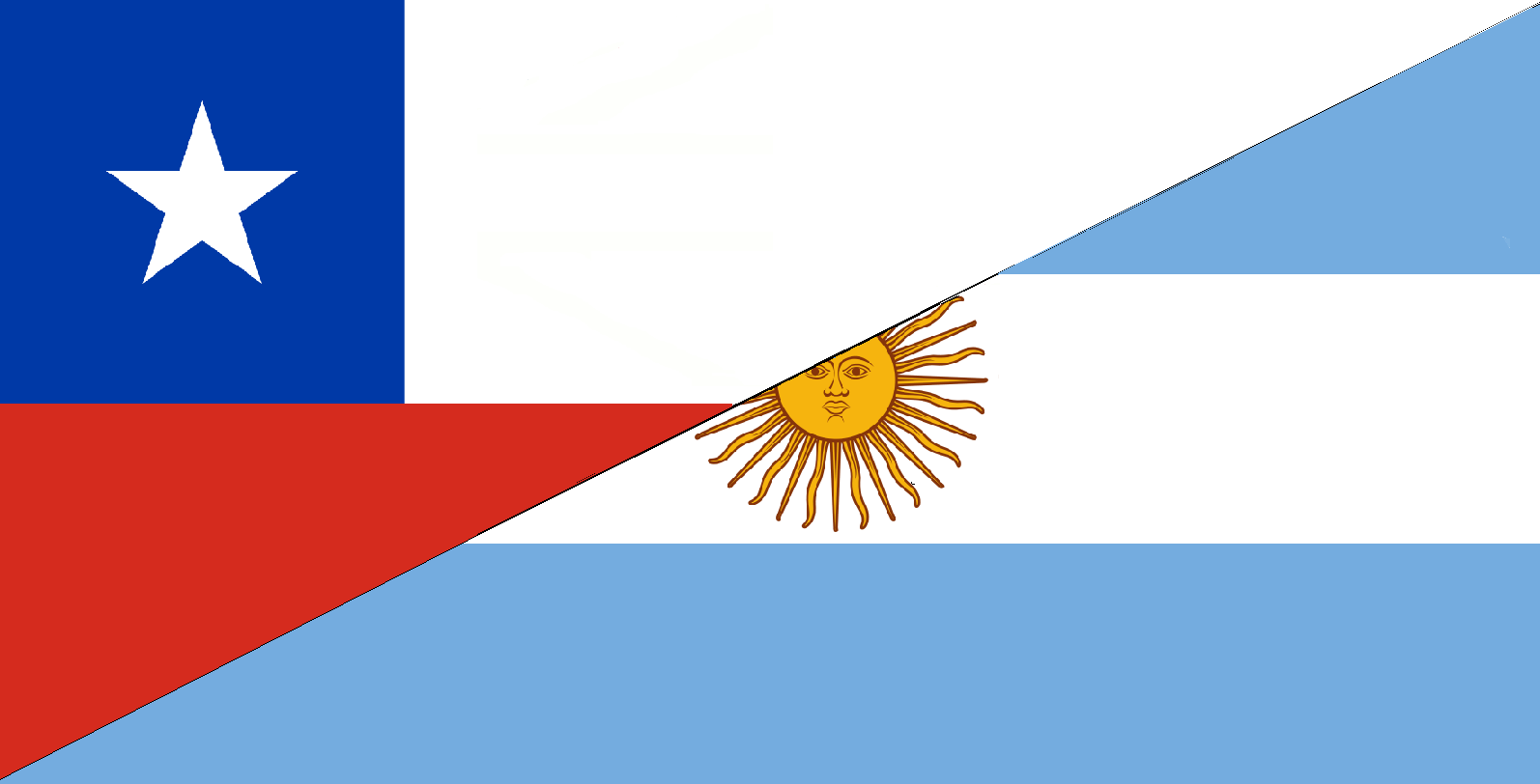

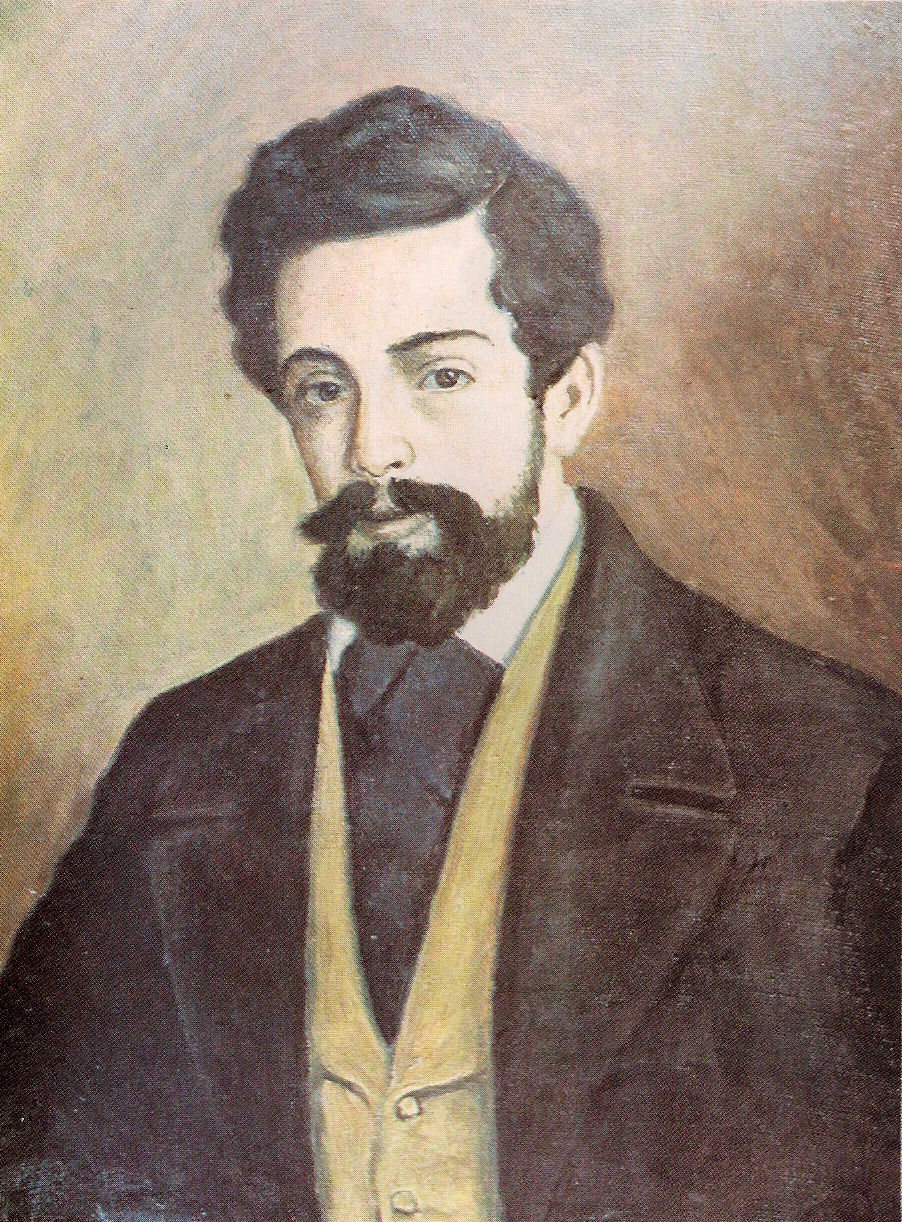
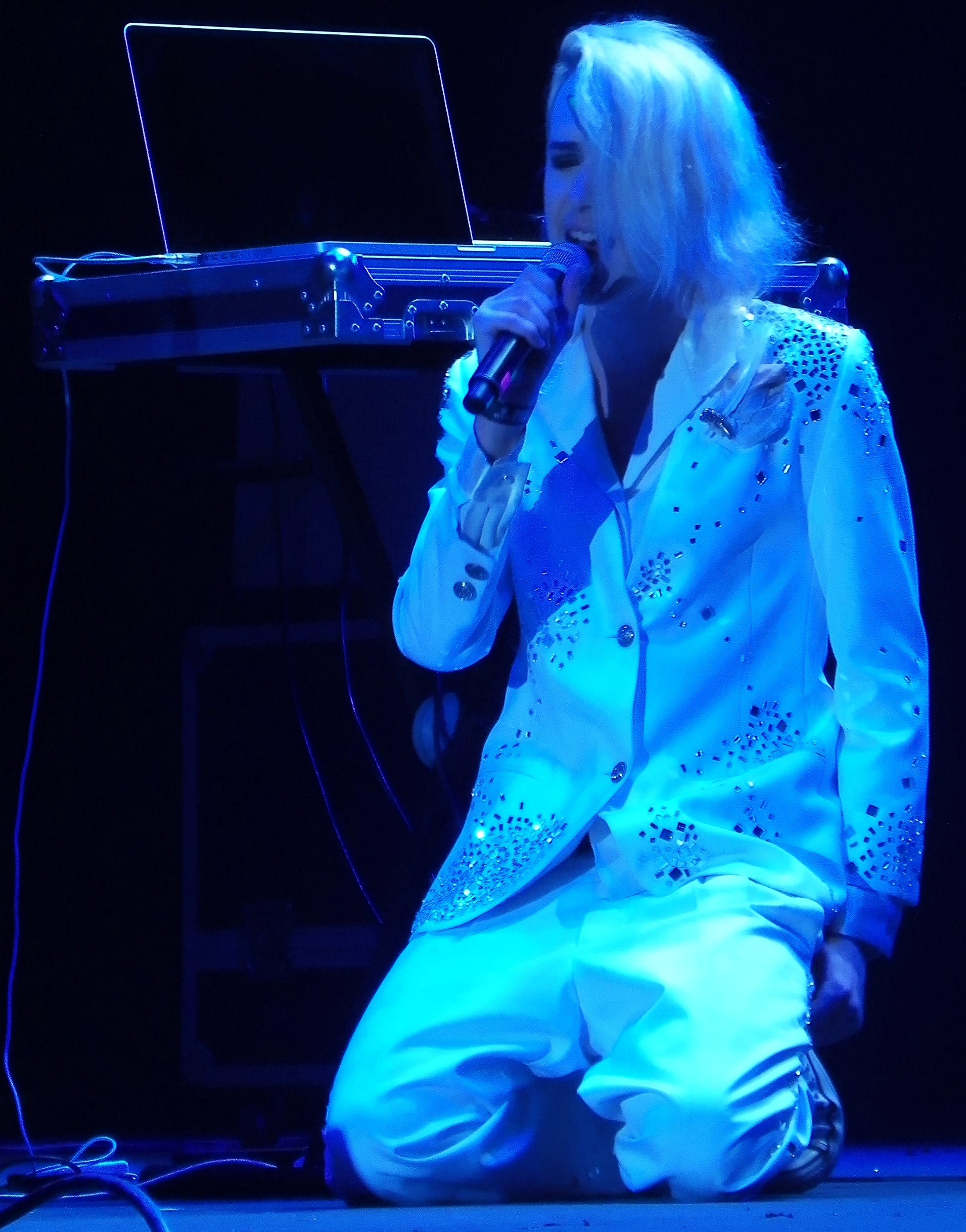
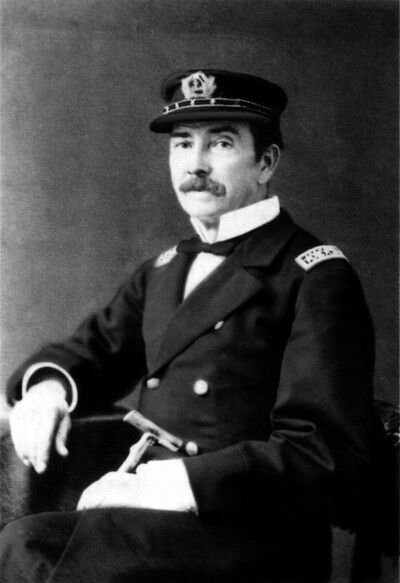
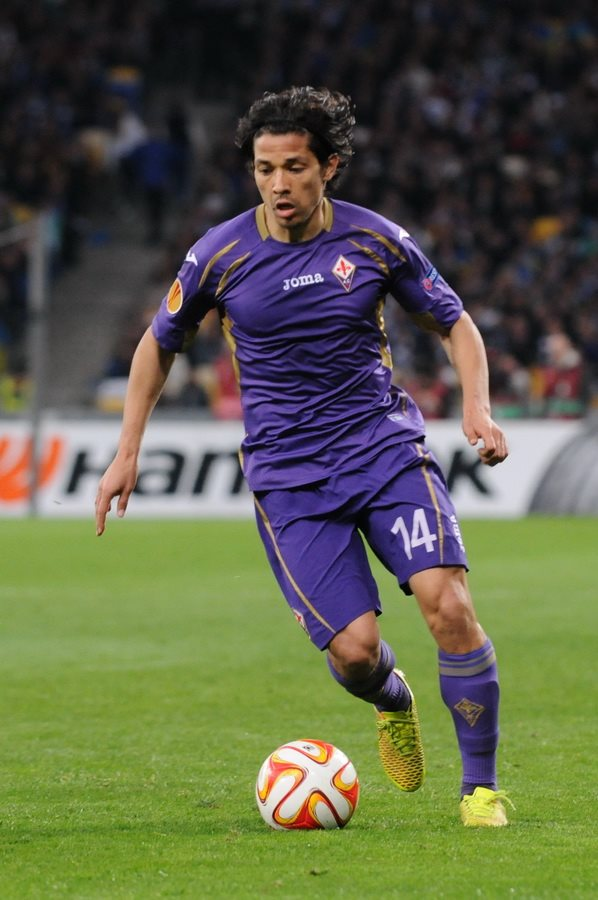
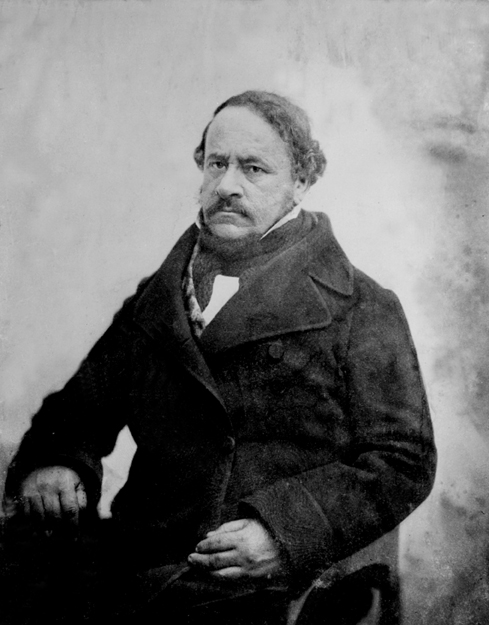
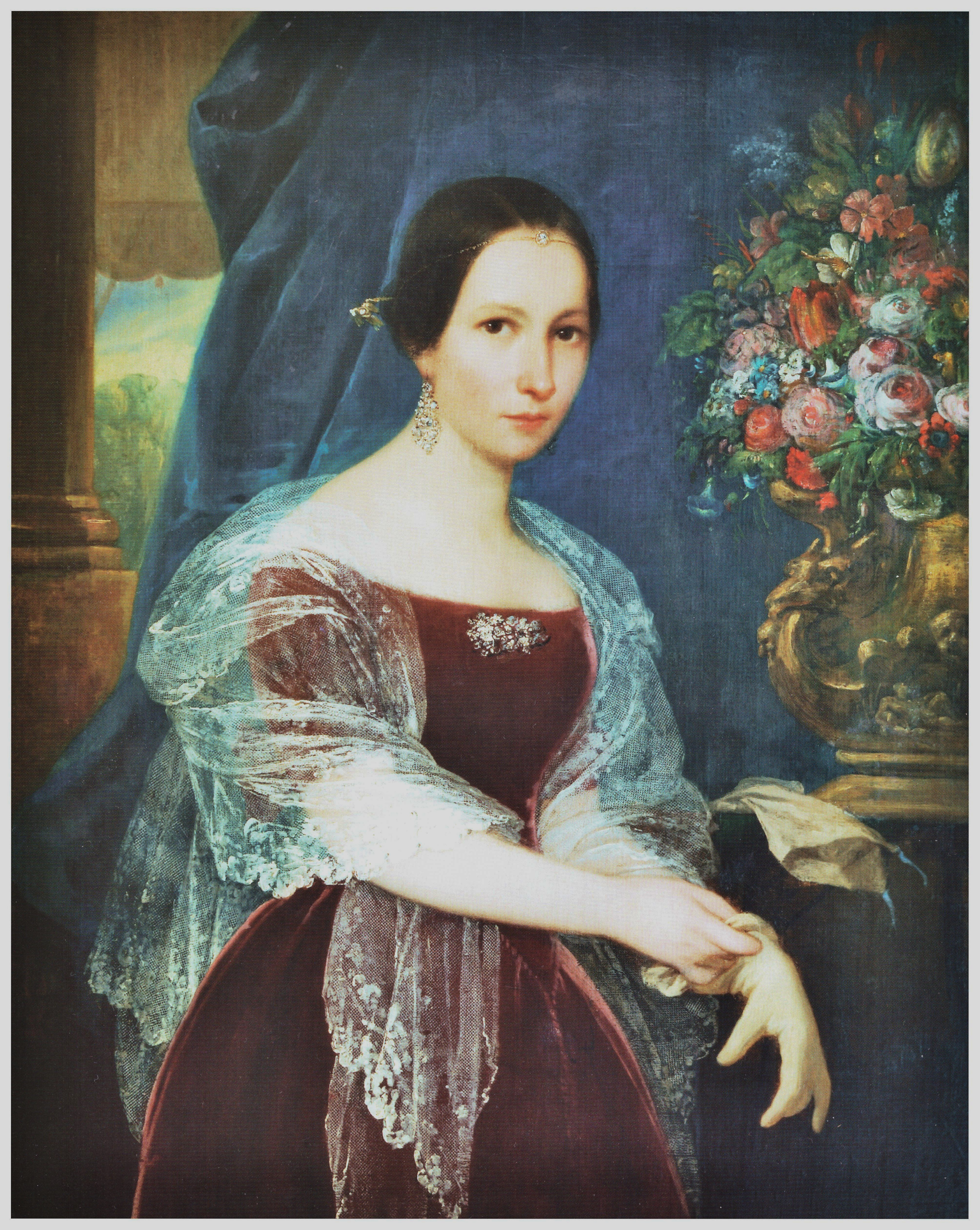
- From left to right: Fermín Vivaceta, Benito Cerati, Patricio Lynch, Matías Fernández, José Zapiola and Enriqueta Pinto de Bulnes

Total population
- 101,202 (2022)

Regions with significant populations
- Santiago: 33,712

Languages
- Chilean Spanish · Rioplatense Spanish

Religion
- Christianity · Judaism

Related ethnic groups
- Chilean Argentine, Argentine diaspora, Argentines

Argentines in Chile consists of mainly of immigrants and expatriates from Argentina as well as their locally born descendants. In 2022, they constituted approximately 85,202 inhabitants, making up approximately 6.5% of the population. In terms of population, the Argentines in Chile are largest Argentine community in Latin America, and one of the largest communities outside of Argentina, occupying third place only behind the United States and Spain.

== History ==
Argentine immigration to Chile is a long-standing phenomenon that dates back to the Independence of Chile and the time of the Army of the Andes. The first Argentines arrived when the Organization of the Republic of Chile was launched in 1823 after Independence, as were the cases of Cornelio Saavedra, Estanislao Lynch, Juan Gregorio Las Heras, Domingo Faustino Sarmiento and Bartolomé Mitre.

The largest number of arrivals of Argentine immigrants to Chile occurred in the 1940s, 1950s and 1960s. After the Revolución Libertadora in the trans-Andean country, the president of Chile, Carlos Ibáñez del Campo granted the status of political asylum to dozens of exiles.

According to the "migration profile of Chile" prepared by the International Organization for Migration, Argentine immigration is the oldest Latin American immigration in Chile, since more than 60% of the Argentine population had arrived in Chilean territory before 1995. According to A 2009 survey, 15% of Argentines arrived before 1969, 5% in the 1970s, 22% in the 1980s, 39% in the 90s and 19% after 2000. As a result of the economic and social crisis that occurred in Argentina at the end of 2001, there was a massive exodus of Argentines abroad, including Chile. Part of the emigrants to Chile were Chilean families with Chilean children born on Argentine soil.

== Notable people ==
- Fermín Vivaceta, architect, teacher and firefighter (born in Santiago) (Argentine citizen father).
- Benito Cerati, singer, musician and composer (born in Santiago) (Argentine father).
- Patricio Lynch, lieutenant in the Royal Navy and a rear admiral in the Chilean Navy (born in Valparaíso) (Irish-Argentine father).
- Matías Fernández, Argentine-born soccer player (born in Caballito) (Argentine mother).
- José Zapiola, musician, composer and orchestra conductor (born in Santiago) (Argentine father).
- Enriqueta Pinto, Argentine-born First Lady of Chile and the wife of President Manuel Bulnes (born in Tucumán).

== See also ==
- Argentina–Chile relations
- Chilean Argentine, Argentines of Chilean descent.
