= United States v. Schooner Peggy =

- Supreme Court of the United States

Argued December 14, December 17, 1801 Decided December 21, 1801
- Full case name: The United States of America v. The Schooner "Peggy"
- Citations: 5 U.S. 103 (more) 1 Cranch 103; 2 L. Ed. 49; 1801 U.S. LEXIS 118

Case history
- Prior: on Writ of Error to the Circuit Court of Connecticut
- Subsequent: Lower court's judgment set aside, ship ordered returned to owners

Holding
- A ruling that a ship be condemned is not a "final sentence" under the treaty of 21 December 1801 until all appeals are completed.

Court membership
- Chief Justice John Marshall Associate Justices William Cushing · William Paterson; Samuel Chase · Bushrod Washington; Alfred Moore

Case opinion
- Majority: Marshall, joined by unanimous

Laws applied
- Treaty between the United States and France of 21 December 1801.

United States v. Schooner Peggy, 5 U.S. (1 Cranch) 103 (1801), was a United States Supreme Court case. It was one of a series of cases resolving disputes over ships captured during the undeclared Quasi-War between the United States and France from 1798 to 1800. The vessel was ordered returned to France.

== Background of the case ==
From 1798 to 1800 the United States and France were engaged in many hostile Naval engagements during the Quasi-War. According to the law at the time an enemy vessel could be captured during time of war and then subject to seizure, a legal process through which the vessel was determined to be property of the capturing party. At the conclusion of the undeclared war with France a treaty was ratified that stated in part:

Property captured and not yet definitively condemned or which may be captured before the exchange of ratifications (contraband goods destined to an enemy's port excepted) shall be mutually restored. This article shall take effect from the date of the signature of the present convention. And if, from the date of the said signature, any property shall be condemned contrary to the intent of the said convention before the knowledge of this stipulation shall be obtained, the property so considered shall without delay be restored, or paid.

The treaty was thus retroactive to all vessels that had been captured but for which their seizure was not yet final.

David Jewett was authorized as commander of the Trumbull to capture any vessel sailing under the flag of France. On April 24, 1800, it came upon the French schooner Peggy and captured it. The Peggy was returned to Connecticut where the local courts ruled her a prize of war in September 1800. The owners of the Peggy appealed to the Supreme Court for her return.

== The decision ==
The court ruled that the treaty was applicable as law and should apply retroactively to all seized vessels whose sentence was not yet final. Since the seizure of the vessel was on appeal to the Supreme Court at the time the treaty was ratified, the seizure was not final. The vessel was ordered to be returned to France.

The case continues to be one in a long line of sometimes inconsistent precedents in civil retroactivity analysis.

== See also ==
- Civil forfeiture
- List of United States Supreme Court cases, volume 5
- Maritime law
- Law of war
- Retroactive legislation
- Nebraska v. One 1970 2-Door Sedan Rambler (Gremlin)
- United States v. 422 Casks of Wine
