= Richard Lynch (disambiguation) =

Richard Lynch (1940–2012) was an American actor.

Richard Lynch may also refer to:

- Richard Lynch (Jesuit) (1611–1676), Irish theologian
- Richard Lynch (Welsh actor) (born 1965), Welsh television and film actor
- Richard Gare Lynch, mayor of Galway
- Dick Lynch (1936–2008), American football player
- Richard Lynch (musician) (born 1962), American country singer
- Richard Lynch (cricketer) (born 1967), English cricketer
- Richard J. Lynch (1921–1997), American law enforcement officer and politician

== See also ==
- Richard Lynche, English poet
