= Edward Lynch =

Edward Lynch or Ed Lynch may refer to:

- Ed Lynch (Florida politician) (born 1965), American businessman and Republican politician
- Ed Lynch (baseball) (born 1956), American retired professional baseball player
- Ed Lynch (cyclist) (born 1929), American Olympic cyclist
- Eddie Lynch (1896–1967), American professional football player
- Eddie Lynch (American football coach) (1899–1953), American collegiate football player and coach
- Edward Francis Lynch (1897–1980), Australian World War I veteran and author
- E. Raymond Lynch, member of the Pennsylvania House of Representatives
