= Heroína (ship) =

- Frigate Heroina in Puerto Soledad - 6 November 1820. Painting by Emilio Biggeri. Source: Museo Naval de la Nación, Tigre, Buenos Aires, Argentina

History

Argentina
- Name: Heroína
- Owner: Patricio (Patrick) Lynch
- Acquired: 1819
- Captured: 20 March 1822
- Fate: Scrapped in Lisbon following capture

General characteristics
- Tons burthen: 475 tons
- Length: 43 m (141 ft)
- Beam: 7 m (23 ft)
- Draught: 3.15 m (10.3 ft)
- Propulsion: sail
- Complement: 190-200 (42 Marines)
- Armament: 30 × 18-pounder
- Notes: Originally the French merchant frigate Braque, purchased in Buenos Aires in 1819 following the delivery of a cargo of timber.

The Heroína (Spanish for "heroine") was a privately owned frigate that was operated as a privateer under a license issued by the United Provinces of the River Plate (later Argentina). It was under the command of American-born Colonel David Jewett and has become linked with the Argentine claim to sovereignty of the Falkland Islands.

== Privateer ==
The Buenos Aires businessman Patrick Lynch acquired the French frigate Braque at some point in 1819/1820. The exact date is unknown with dates for the transaction ranging from August 1819 until January 1820. Initially it was planned to name the ship Tomás Guido but that name was considered inappropriate as Guido, Chief Secretary of the Army, was still alive at the time. He finally settled for Heroína.

After fitting out the ship to act as a privateer, Lynch obtained a corsair license from the Buenos Aires Supreme Director José Rondeau. Colonel David Jewett, an American privateer was given command of Heroína in 1820.

In July 1820, between Cape Verde and Spain, Jewett captured the Portuguese frigate Carlota that was en route to Lisbon. In doing so, Jewett crossed the line between privateer and pirate, since his corsairs license restricted his activities to Spanish ships (the United Provinces of the River Plate were not at war with Portugal). Jewett continued to capture ships of other flags causing further controversy.

In August, the crew mutinied and Jewett was only able to restore order with the support of the soldiers on board. The leader of the mutiny, James Thomas, was executed. Following the mutiny there was an outbreak of scurvy at a time when the crew of the Heroína was depleted by the need to man the prize Carlota. A storm severely damaged the Heroína and sank the Carlota, just three days before reaching the Falkland Islands.

== Falkland Islands ==
Some 80 of the Heroína's crew of 200 were either sick or dead by the time he arrived in October at Puerto Soledad (later renamed Puerto Luis by Argentine settlers in line with the original French name, it was at one-time Spanish capital of the Falkland Islands). There he found some fifty British and U.S. sealing ships at anchor. Captain Jewett chose to rest and recover in the islands seeking assistance from the British explorer James Weddell. Weddell reports only 30 seamen and 40 soldiers out of a crew of 200 fit for duty, and how Jewett slept with pistols over his head following an attempted mutiny. Whilst in the Falkland Islands, there was a further attempt at mutiny with the crew eager to return to Buenos Aires.

On 6 November 1820, Col Jewett raised the flag of the United Provinces of the River Plate and claimed possession of the islands. Weddell reports the letter he received from Jewett as:

Sir, I have the honour to inform you of the circumstance of my arrival at this port, commissioned by the supreme government of the United Provinces of South America to take possession of these islands in the name of the country to which they naturally appertain. In the performance of this duty, it is my desire to act towards all friendly flags with the most distinguished justice and politeness. A principal object is to prevent the wanton destruction of the sources of supply to those whose necessities compel or invite them to visit the islands, and to aid and assist such as require it to obtain a supply with the least trouble and expense. As your views do not enter into contravention or competition with these orders, and as I think mutual advantage may result from a personal interview, I invite you to pay me a visit on board my ship, where I shall be happy to accommodate you during your pleasure. I would also beg you, so far as comes within your sphere, to communicate this information to other British subjects in this vicinity. I have the honour to be, Sir Your most obedient humble Servant, Signed, Jewett, Colonel of the Navy of the United Provinces of South America and commander of the frigateHeroína.

Many modern authors report this letter as the declaration issued by Jewett. The Heroína received Weddell's assistance in obtaining anchorage off of Port Louis, and, Weddell describes how Jewett, "In a few days, he took formal possession of these islands for the patriot government of Buenos Ayres, read a declaration under their colours, planted on a port in ruins, and fired a salute of twenty-one guns." Weddell also linked the ceremony to Jewett's claim to the wreck of the Uranie and that it was calculated to make an impression on the masters of ships in the area. Some ship-masters were alarmed by Jewett's appearance, fearing being robbed or captured and one contemplated an armed response. Weddell was able to convince him Jewett was no danger and after being introduced to Jewett, he overcame his fears.

Weddell left the islands on 20 November 1820 noting that Jewett had not completed repairs to the Heroína. On leaving the Islands, Jewett took the American schooner Rampart as a prize, an incident that had diplomatic repercussions with the United States of America.

== Capture ==
In February 1821, Jewett was relieved of command being replaced by Guillermo Roberto Mason. On June 14, 1821 Heroína captured the Spanish brig Maipú, which was incorporated into the flotilla. Mason also attacked and seized the Portuguese ships Viscondesa and Providencia before putting into Gibraltar for repairs.

On 20 March 1822 the Heroína was met by the Portuguese 44-gun frigate Pérola off Gibraltar. The Pérola managed to approach the Heroína and fired a broadside at point-blank range, ravaging the deck on the Heroína and forcing Mason to surrender. The Heroína was taken to Lisbon as a prize. For his action the Portuguese commander, captain Marçal de Ataíde Barahona, was made a knight of the Portuguese Military Order of the Tower and of the Sword, of Valour, Loyalty and Merit. The actions of the Heroína in seizing Portuguese ships led to her being labelled as a pirate ship.

Mason was held by Portugal for two years before returning to Buenos Aires.

== Bibliography ==
- Child, Jack. Geopolitics and Conflict in South America: Quarrels Among Neighbors. New York; Praeger, 1985, pp. 112–115.
- Gough, Barry. The Falkland Islands/Malvinas: The Contest for Empire in the South Atlantic. London: Athlone Press, 1992, pp. 55–59.
- Strange, Ian J. The Falkland Islands. London: David & Charles Press, 1983, p. 194.
- Pereira, José António R. A Marinha Portuguesa na Época de Napoleão - campanhas navais 1807-1823; volume II: A Armada e o Brasil. Lisbon, Tribuna de História, Edição de Livros e Revistas Lda, 2005, p. 79.
- Instituto dos Arquivos Nacionais Torre do Tombo (National Archives Institute, Portugal) – Mercês de D. Maria II, book V
