= Chilean Argentines =

Chileno-argentinos (Spanish)
- People born in Chile by province according to RENAPER in 2023 (Not including descendants of Chileans)

Total population
- 149,082 (by birth, 2022); 439,582 (by ancestry, 2018); 1.0% of the Argentine population

Regions with significant populations
- Buenos Aires and the Argentine Patagonia

Languages
- Spanish; Mapuche

Religion
- Roman Catholicism; Mapuche religion

Related ethnic groups
- Chileans; Chilean Americans · Chilean Brazilians

Chilean Argentines are Argentine citizens of Chilean descent or Chile-born people who reside in Argentina. Argentina is home to the largest Chilean diaspora group. According to the Argentine 2010 census, there are 191.147 Chileans living in the country (born in Chilean territory). An estimate 2003-2004 estimated Chilean descendants, born in Argentina to a Chilean father or mother, in 190,000.

Other figures, such as those by The World Factbook, show a total population (including those born in Chile and their descendants) of 429,708 people.

Chilean immigration to Argentina dates back to colonial times. During the War of Independence of Chile, the period known as the Patria Vieja, ended with the defeat of the patriot forces at the Battle of Rancagua on October 1 and 2, 1814. The patriots who were crossing the Andes took refuge in the United Provinces of the Río de la Plata. Some of them returned to their country with the Army of the Andes in 1817 achieving restore the independence of Chile.

The countries share language, customs, history, and the Argentina–Chile border, one of the longest borders in the world, among other things.

== History ==
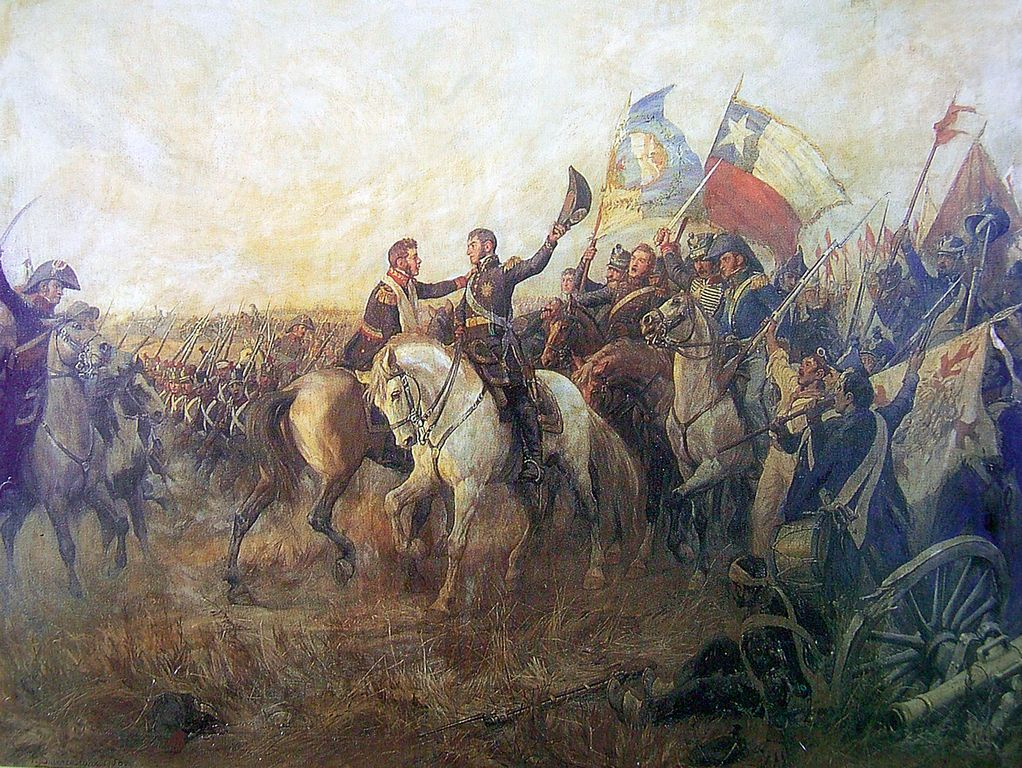
Abrazo de Maipú by Pedro Subercaseaux, which represents the respective founding fathers, Bernardo O'Higgins and José de San Martín

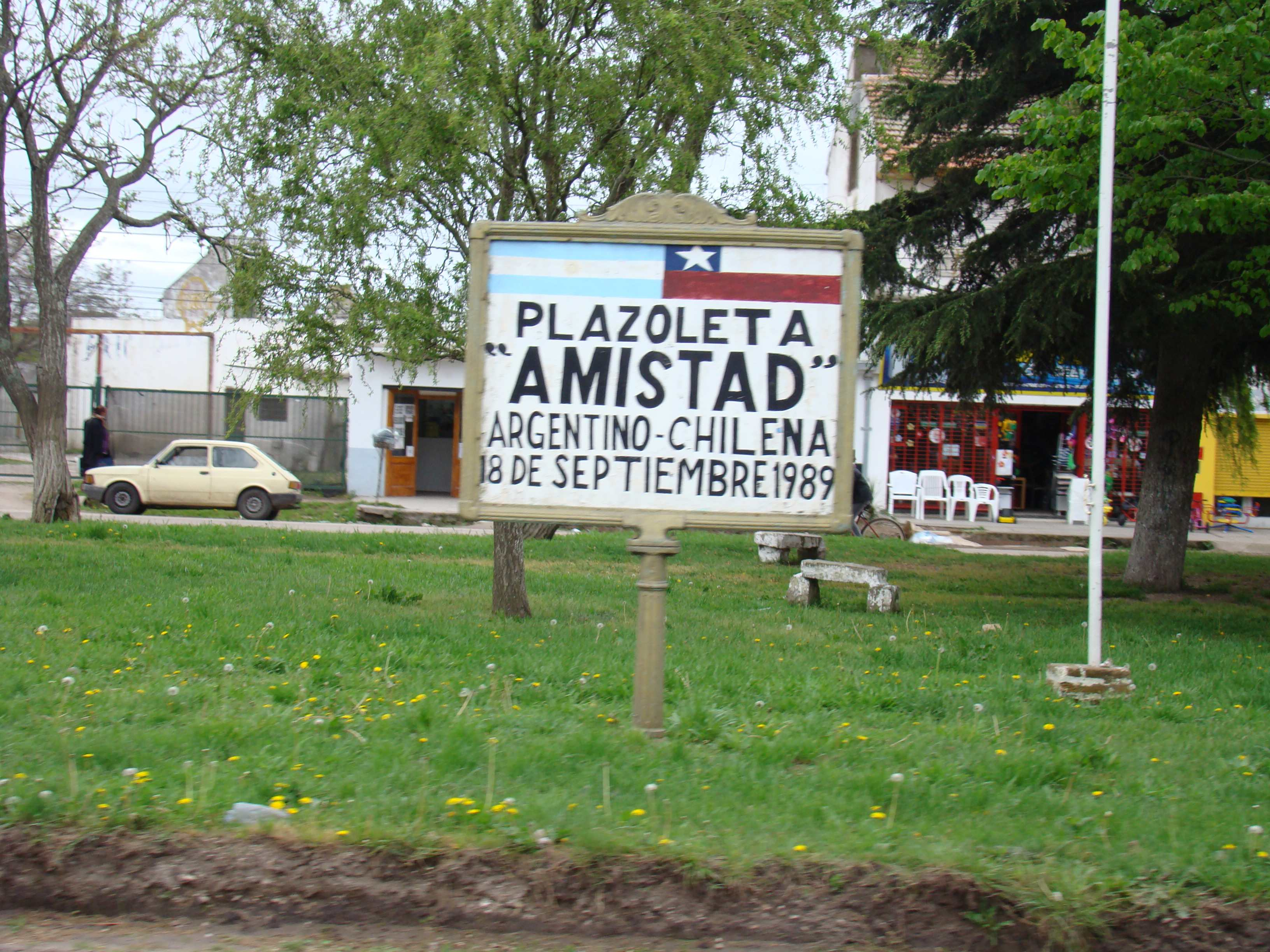
A small square called Friendship Amistad built in 1989, in Buenos Aires Province, reflecting the Chilean Argentine harmony.

The migration process between the two countries dates back to colonial times. A memorable case was that of Chilean migration to Argentina after the Battle of Rancagua and the Spanish reconquest of Chile between 1814 and 1817.

From the late 19th century there was a steady migration from the Chiloé Archipelago to the southern provinces of Argentina, to work on sheep farms. Since then, their descendants have been an important part of the Chilean population resident in southern Argentina, to the point that the term "chilote" is a derogatory nickname for any Chilean.

However, Chilean migration increased dramatically after the coup in 1973 Chilean coup d'état led by Augusto Pinochet after the Chilean military government exiled opponents of the military regime, who joined many opponents who had left Chile voluntarily. This did not last long, as Argentina underwent a coup itself three years later. After the return of democracy to Chile in 1990, some citizens of that country returned to their homeland, but others settled in Argentina, especially in the Patagonia region, where 53% of Chilean Argentines live, exceeding 5% of the total population of each province, and the region of Cuyo, where they form 12% of the total population. 18% of Chilean Argentines live in Buenos Aires.

== Gallery ==
Chilean Argentines
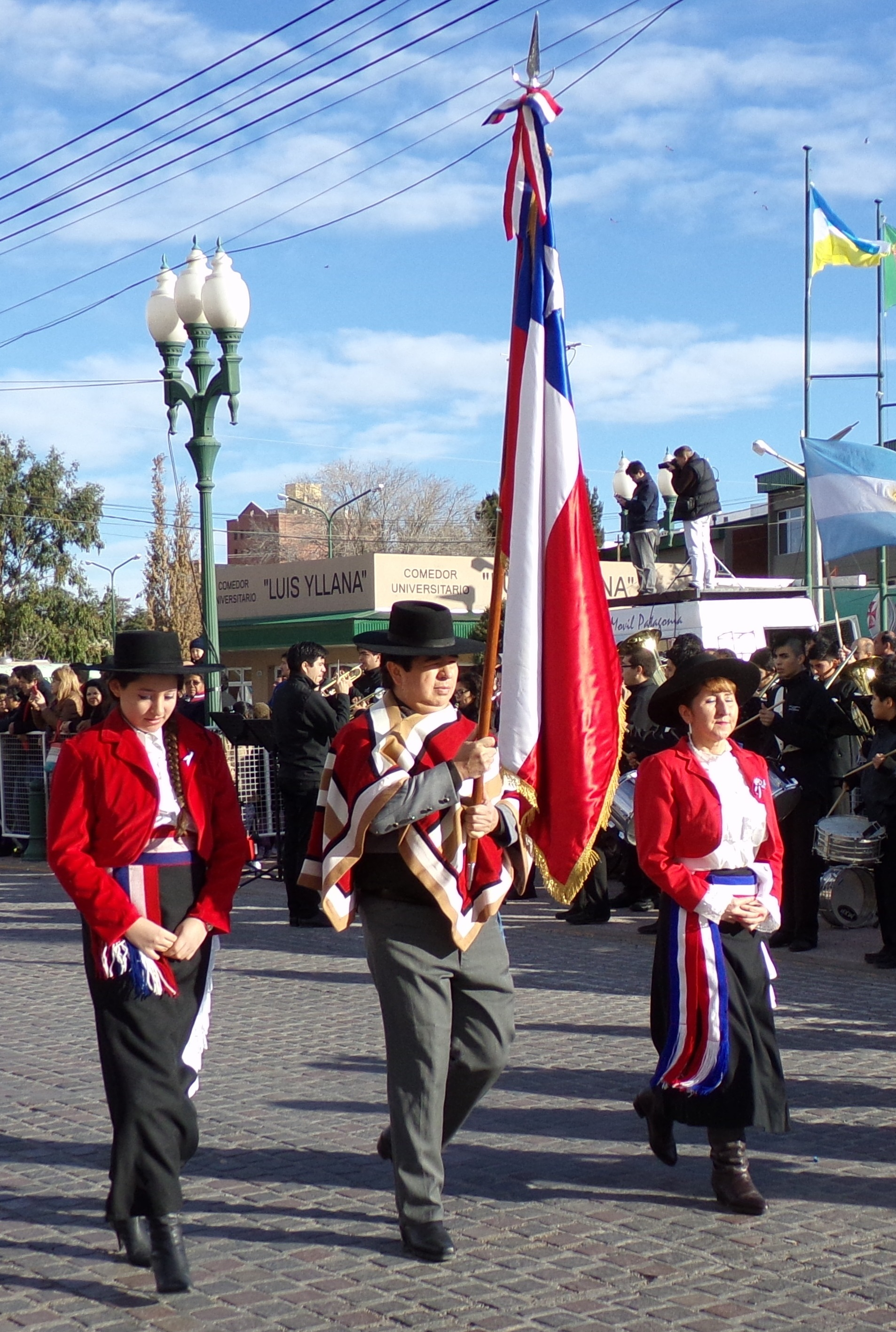
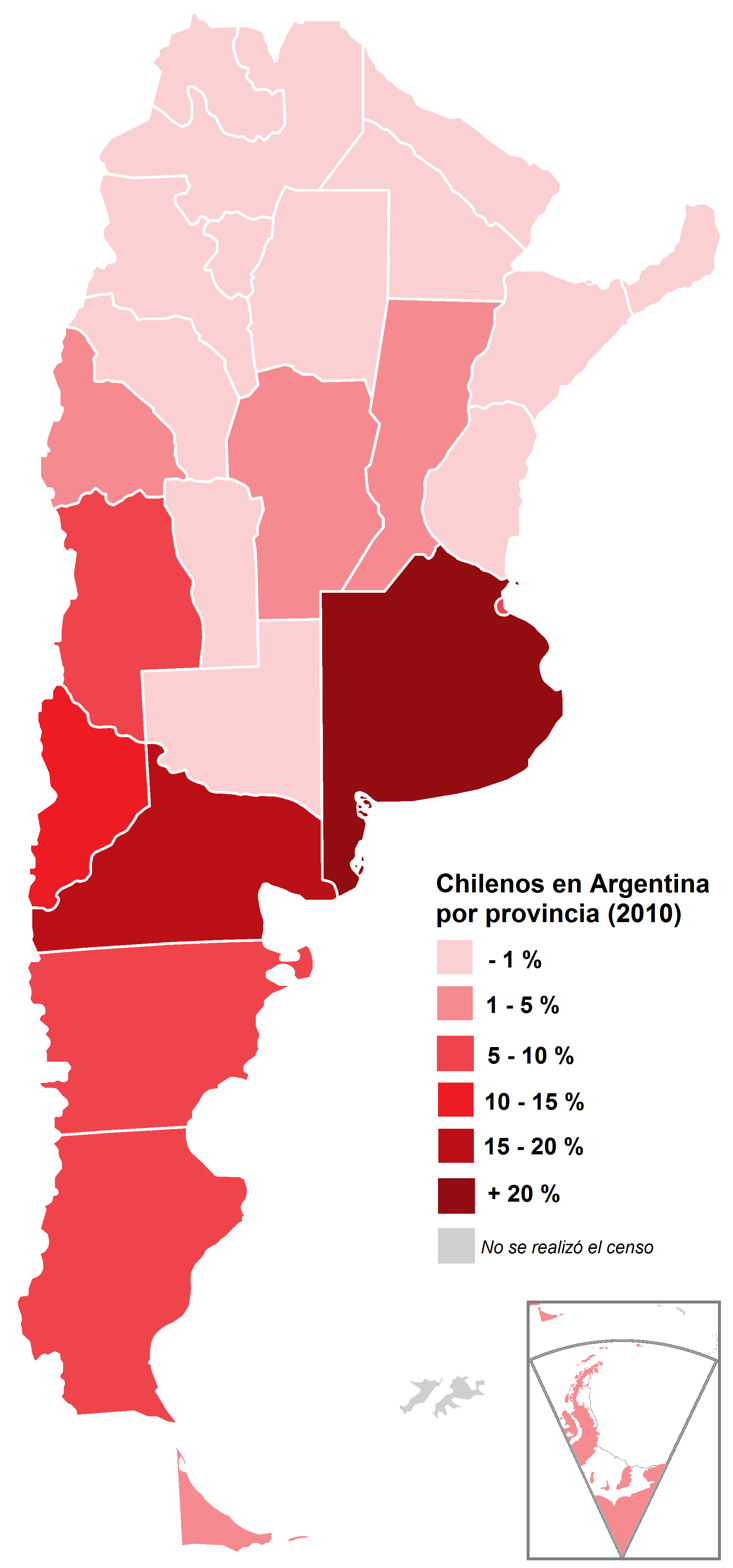
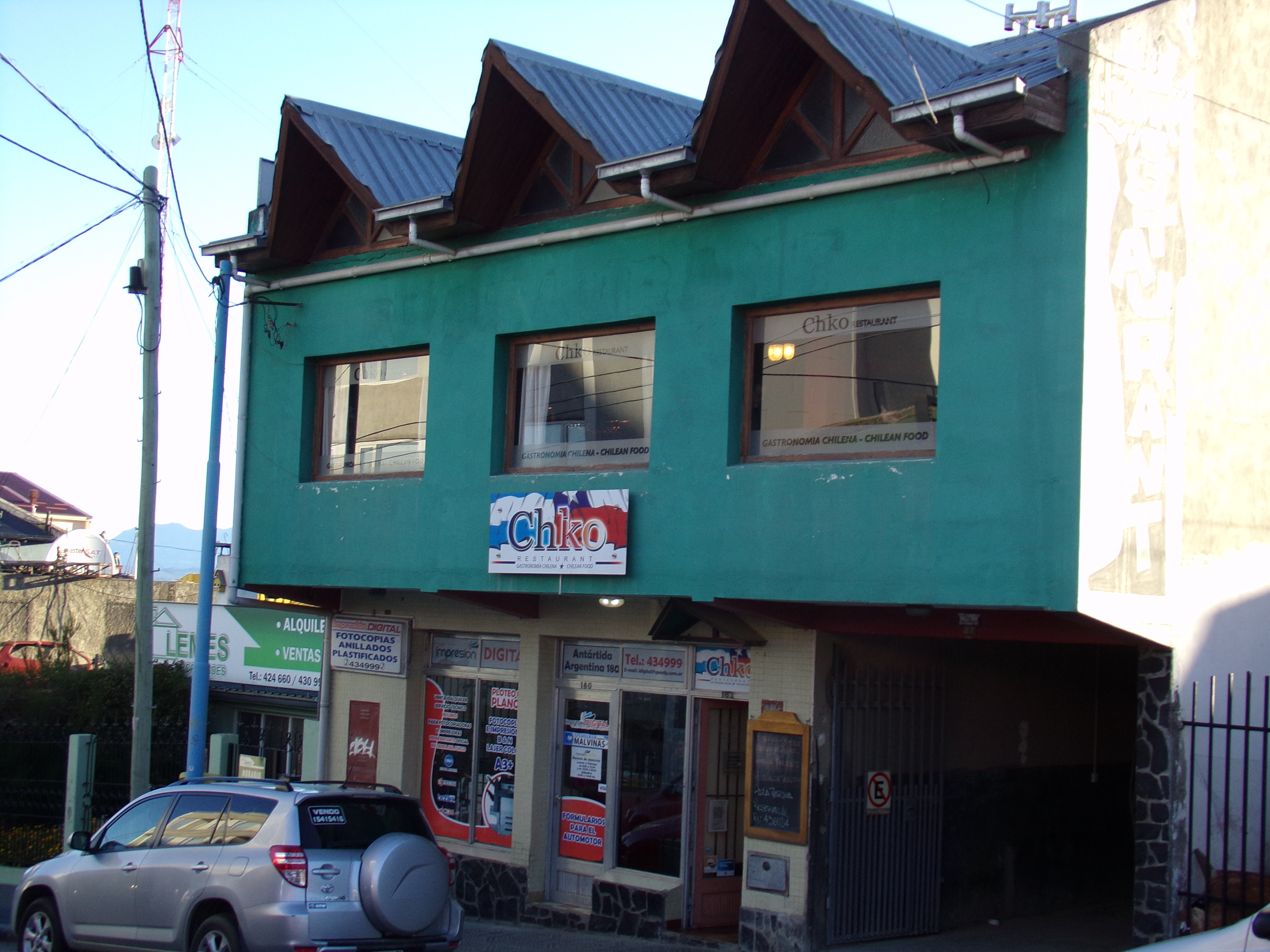
1.The Chilean community present at the Trelew Immigrant Festival, 2.The distribution of Chilean Argentines by Argentine provinces. (2010), 3. A Chilean restaurant in Ushuaia .

== Notable people ==
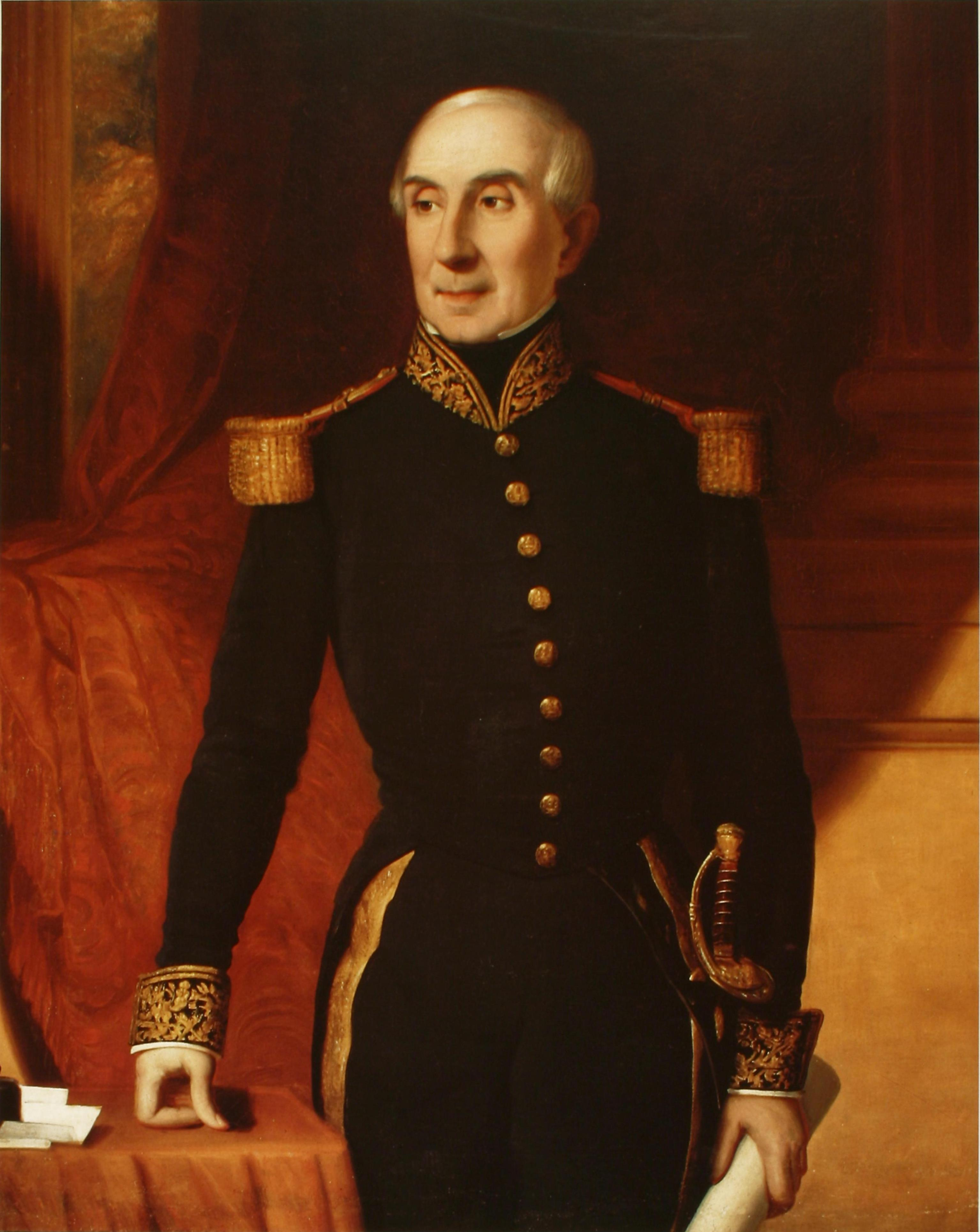
Manuel Blanco Encalada

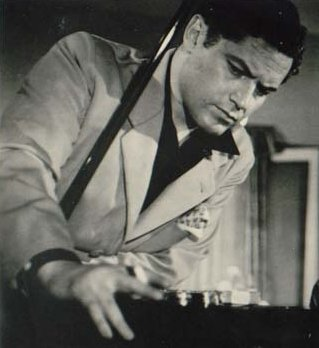
Lautaro Murúa

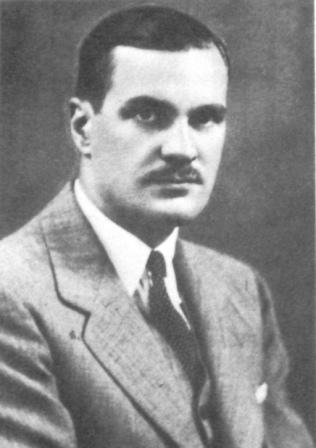
Eduardo Braun-Menéndez

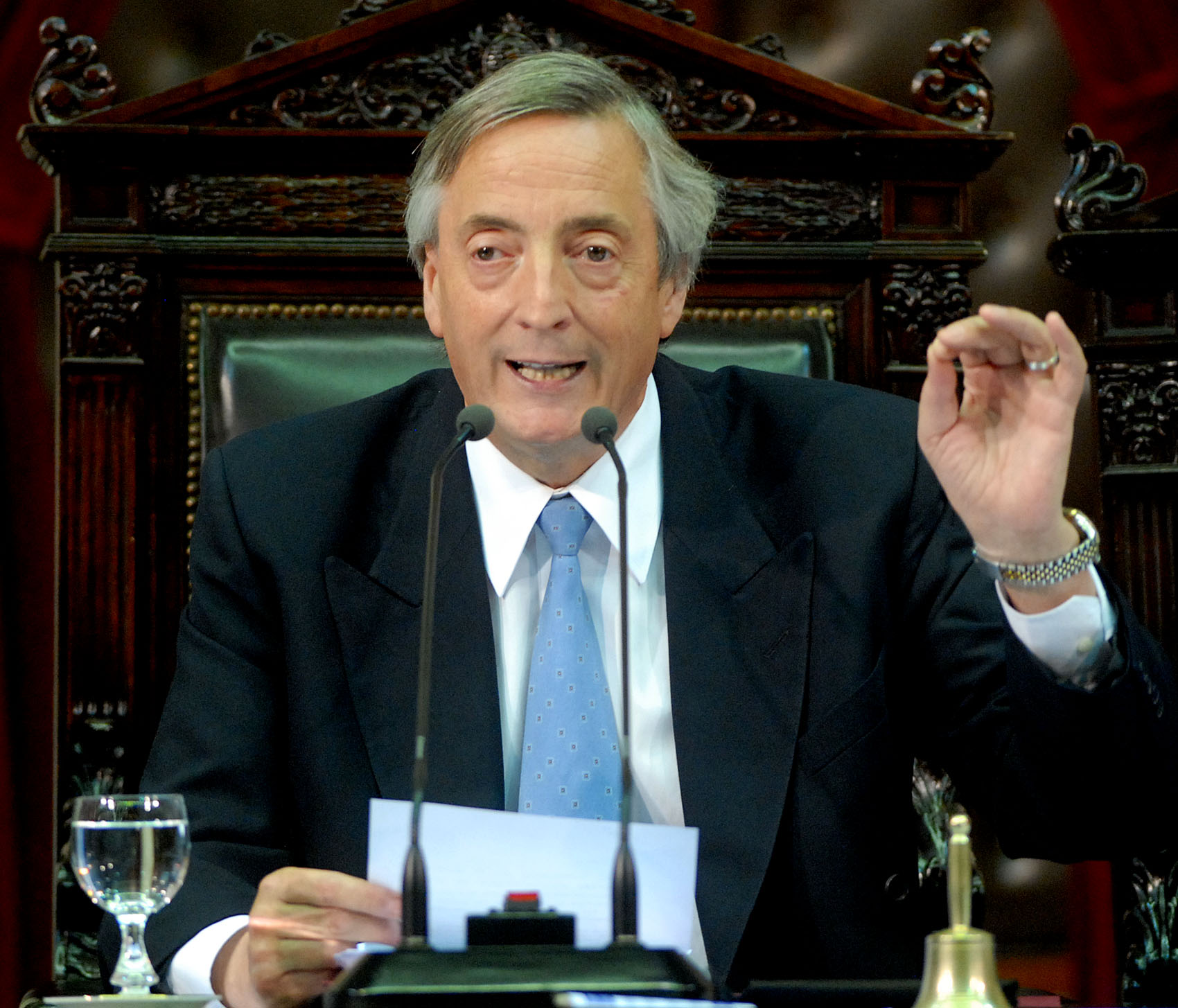
Néstor Kirchner

== See also ==
- Argentina–Chile relations
- Immigration to Argentina
- Argentine Chileans
