= Douglas Lynch =

Douglas Lynch may refer to:

- Douglas E. Lynch (born 1964), academic
- Doug Lynch (ice hockey) (born 1983), Canadian ice hockey player
- Douglas Lynch (businessman) (1926–2016), Barbadian businessman and lawyer
