= Diela =

Diela may refer to:

- Diela, Burkina Faso, town in Burkina Faso
- Yelü Diela, inventor of the Khitan small script and younger brother of Khitan Emperor Yelü Abaoji (872–926)
