= Patrick Lynch (Argentina) =

Irish landowner (1715-1789)

Personal details
- Born: 13 October 1720 Claregalway, Ireland
- Died: 1763 (aged 42–43) Buenos Aires, Argentina
- Spouse: Rosa Galayn de la Camara
- Parent(s): Patrick Lynch; Agnes Blake
- Occupation: Politician; merchant
- Profession: Army's officer

Military service
- Allegiance: Spanish Empire
- Branch/service: Spanish Army
- Years of service: c.1730-1770s
- Rank: Captain
- Unit: Regiment of Hibernia (in Spain)

Patrick Lynch (13 October 1720 – 1763) was an Irish emigrant who became a significant landowner in the Rio de la Plata region, which is now part of Argentina. He is also related to Pat Lynch, an Irish singer with the Aircords during the 1960s.

== Biography ==
He was born in Galway, and was the second son of Captain Patrick Lynch of Lydican Castle and Agnes Blake. The Lynches and the Blakes were two of the 14 tribes of Galway, who dominated the political, commercial, and social life of the city of Galway in western Ireland between the mid-13th and late-19th centuries. The Lynches left Ireland after their defeat at the hands of Cromwell's forces and later those of William of Orange. Patrick left in the 1740s for Bilbao, Spain, and travelled from there to Rio de la Plata, where he was appointed "regidor" (royal representative) and captain in the "Milicias". In 1749, he married Rosa de Galayn y de la Camara, a wealthy Argentine heiress. His eldest surviving son, Justo Pastor Lynch who was a customs official under Viceroy Cisneros, also a captain and regidor, inherited Captain Lynch's vast land holdings.

== Descendants ==
Lynch's descendants through various branches of the family include the following:

- Patricio (Patrick) Lynch, (grandson), who set up a shipping company. He fitted the privateer frigate "Heroina", commanded by the American Colonel David Jewett which went after Spanish ships in 1820. Patricio Lynch married Maria Isabel de Zavaleta y Riglos, a descendant of the Conquistador Domingo Martínez de Irala through the Spanish aristocrat Riquelme de Guzman, who was forced by Irala to marry Ursula, one of his mestizo daughters. Patricio and Maria are the great-great-grandparents of Che Guevara, (see below).
- Estanislao Lynch, (grandson) a former officer in the Argentine Army of the Andes, brother of Patricio, above
- Benito Lynch (grandson) who fought at Trafalgar
- Patricio Lynch, (great-grandson), a rear-admiral in the Chilean Navy, who served in China in HMS Calliope, son of Estanislao, above
- Francisco Lynch, (great-grandson), Argentine soldier who participated in the War of Independence and the civil wars of his country, and the Cisplatine War. Great-grandfather of Che Guevara.
- Benito Lynch, (great-great-great-grandson), Argentine novelist and short-story writer of gaucho literature
- Enrique Lynch del Solar, (great-great-grandson) Chilean painter, organizer of the modernist art movement in Valparaíso, Chile
- Nicolás Barrios-Lynch, (great-great-great-grandson) Argentine educator and researcher, founder of Argentina's Rural Libraries movement
- Adolfo Bioy Casares, (great-great-great-great-grandson), Argentine writer
- Ernesto Guevara Lynch, (great-great-great-grandson) father of Che Guevara
- Che Guevara, (great-great-great-great-grandson), Cuban-Argentine revolutionary
