= Argentina–Chile border =

International border in South America

Coordinates: 22°49′S 67°11′W

Location of Argentina (green) and Chile (orange).

The Argentina–Chile border is the longest international border of South America and the third longest in the world after the Canada–United States border and the Kazakhstan–Russia border. With a length of 5,308 kilometres (3,298 mi), it separates Argentina from Chile along the Andes and on the islands of Tierra del Fuego. However, there are some border disputes, particularly around the Southern Patagonian Ice Field. It is the largest border of the two countries, beating the Argentina–Paraguay and Chile–Bolivia, Argentina's and Chile's second longest borders, respectively.

Many crossings along the border are also mountain passes along the continental divide. In the far south and far north the border follows straight lines between summits or along parallels or meridians.

== Description ==
This map shows the current border in the Southern Patagonian Ice Field, the B Section is pending to be defined.

The northern end of the border is a tripoint it forms with those at the Argentina–Bolivia border and the Bolivia-Chile border in the arid Puna de Atacama plateau. The border extends south until reaching the sea at the same place the Strait of Magellan meets the Atlantic Ocean. Further south the border on the Isla Grande de Tierra del Fuego follows a meridian separating the island into two. This boundary reaches the sea at Beagle Channel a few kilometers southwest of Ushuaia.

In November 1984 the southern border area was finally established after long negotiations and mediation of John Paul II by the Treaty of Peace and Friendship of 1984 between Chile and Argentina, a perpetual treaty, signed at the Vatican by representatives of both countries.

On 16 December 1998, an agreement between Argentina and Chile was signed to redefine the border line from Mount Fitz Roy and Mount Daudet and finish with the historical dispute. However the countries could not agree in the section between Mount Fitz Roy and Mount Murallón, and the border is still undefined. Only Chile shows this on the cartography, while Argentina shows its pre-1998 claim, not following the new border between Murallón and Daudet from the agreement, nor indicating the pending section.

Overlapping Argentine and Chilean Antarctic claims on Antarctica (1946–present).

The territorial claims of Argentina and Chile over Antarctica partially overlap with each other. Chile claims for itself the Chilean Antarctic Territory, which is included in the Region of Magallanes and Chilean Antarctica, while Argentina claims Argentine Antarctica, whose territory is part of the province of Tierra del Fuego, Antarctica and South Atlantic Islands.

Both countries recognize each other's territories that do not overlap with their own as stipulated in the protocols of 1947, 1948, 1964, 1971 and 1978.

Both countries have areas reachable by road only through the other country. Magallanes Region in Chile requires an around 1400 km drive through Argentina if driving from the more northern parts of Chile. Tierra del Fuego of Argentina requires 220 km drive through Chile from nearest other part of Argentina.

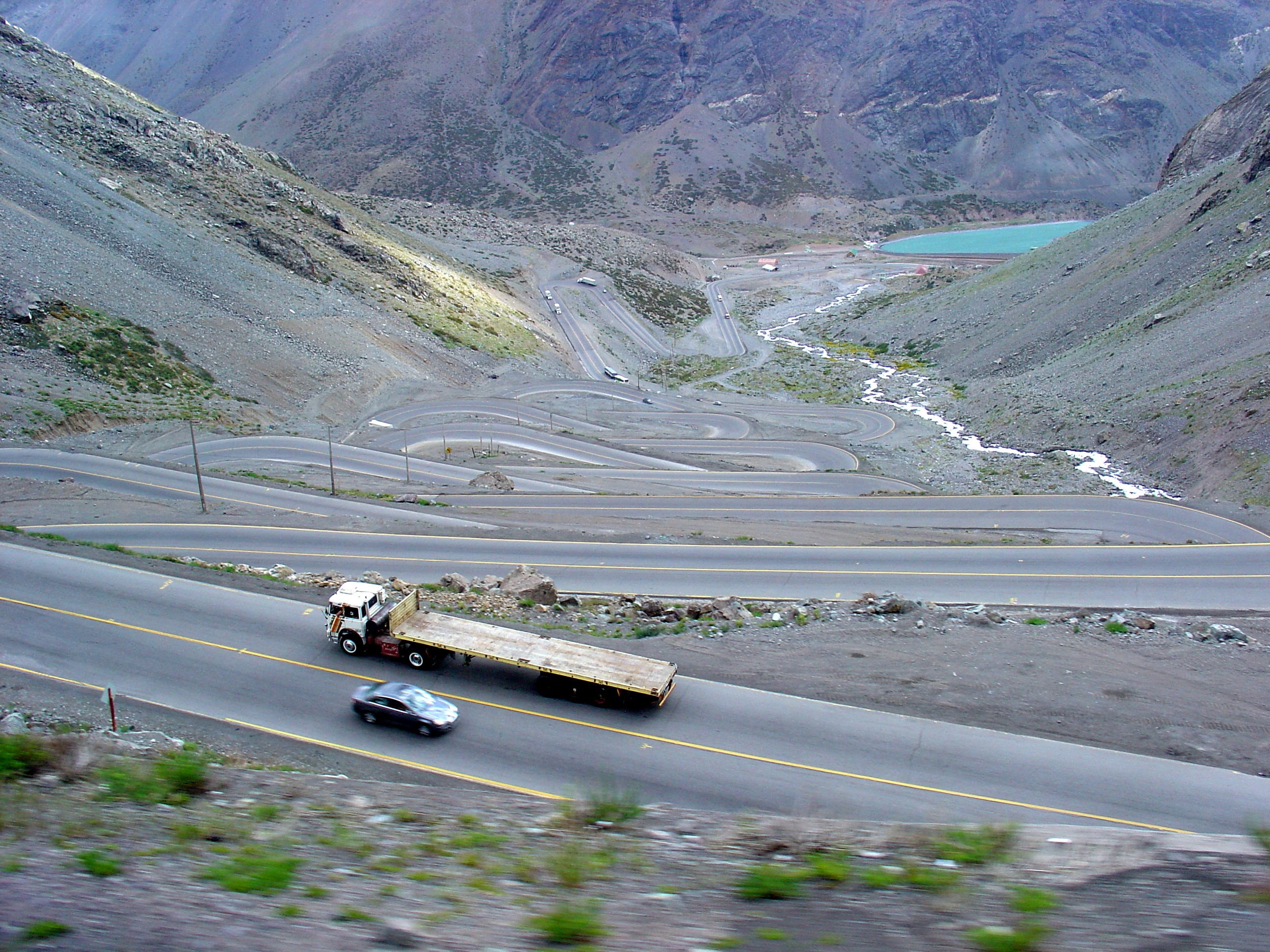
Road in the border area between Santiago and Mendoza

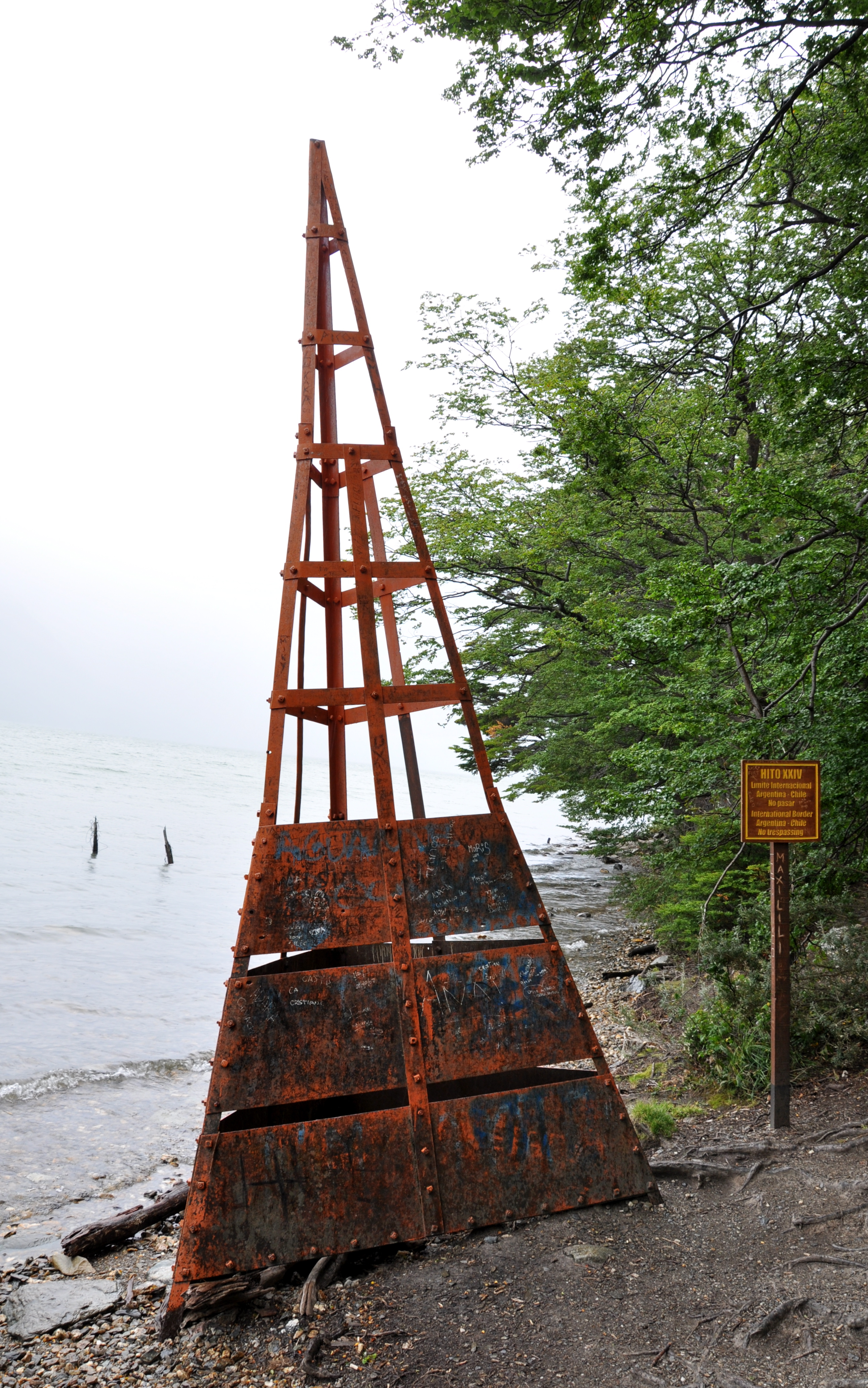
Marker (hito XXIV) in Tierra del Fuego.

The overlapping claims to Antarctica of Argentina and Chile: Argentine Antarctica and the Chilean Antarctic Territory, both overlapping the UK's British Antarctic Territory.

=== Dispute over the extended continental shelf ===
Map of the dispute.

The United Nations Convention on the Law of the Sea (UNCLOS) of April 30, 1982, which entered into force on November 16, 1994, established the regime of the continental shelf in Part VI (Articles 76 to 85), defining in Article 76, paragraph 1 what is understood as a continental shelf.

Argentina ratified the convention on January 12, 1995, and it came into force for the country on December 31, 1995.

On August 25, 1997, Chile signed and ratified the United Nations Convention on the Law of the Sea, and it entered into force for the country on September 24, 1997.

In 2009, Argentina submitted a presentation to the United Nations Commission on the Limits of the Continental Shelf, which was accepted in 2016 by the UNCLOS. The map in the submission included the disputed territories with the United Kingdom, such as the Falkland Islands, South Georgia, and South Sandwich Islands, a crescent-shaped area south of Argentina's territorial sea as defined in the 1984 treaty with Chile. This area was also claimed by Chile as part of its presential sea, and the sea surrounding the Antarctic Peninsula, which is claimed by all three aforementioned countries. That same year, on May 8, Chile submitted its Preliminary Report to the United Nations Commission on the Limits of the Continental Shelf.

In 2020, the Argentine Chamber of Deputies unanimously approved the outer limit of the Argentine Continental Shelf in Law 27,557.

That same year, on December 21, Chile submitted to the United Nations Commission on the Limits of the Continental Shelf the partial report on the extended continental shelf in Easter Island and Salas y Gómez.

In 2021, Chilean President Sebastián Piñera signed Supreme Decree No. 95, which outlined the continental shelf east of the 67º 16' 0 meridian as part of Chile's continental shelf (not the extended one) area projected from the Diego Ramírez Islands, also claiming the crescent area that Argentina considers part of its extension achieved under the extended continental shelf principle. This was reflected in the SHOA Chart No. 8 and prompted a response from the Argentine Foreign Ministry against Chile's measure.

In February 2022, Chile submitted its second partial presentation regarding the Western Continental Shelf of the Chilean Antarctic Territory. In August of the same year, Chile made the oral presentations of both partial submissions during the 55th Session of the Commission on the Limits of the Continental Shelf at the United Nations in New York.

In 2023, Chile, through SHOA, made available an illustrative graphic showing all the maritime areas claimed by the country, which was once again rejected by Argentina.

In July 2023, the International Court of Justice ruled on the priority of a Continental Shelf over an Extended Continental Shelf in the case of the territorial and maritime dispute between Colombia and Nicaragua.

== Mining near or at the border ==
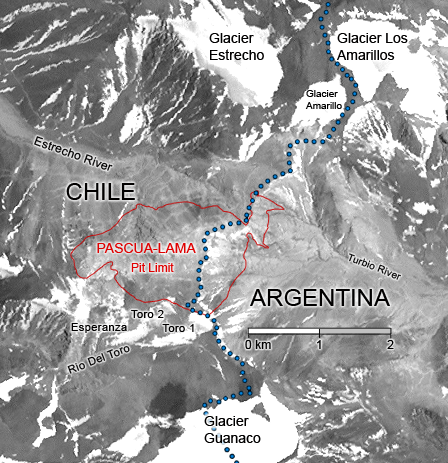
Satellite view of the project area showing the proposed Pascua Lama open pit in red.

Since the late 1970s various mining projects have been developed in the vicinity of the north-central part of the border leading in some cases to issues related to the bi-nationality of some ore deposits and mines like Pascua Lama. The metallogenic province of El Indio Gold Belt straddles the north-central part of the border. The open pit of Los Pelambres, Chile's fourth most productive copper mine, lies less than one km from the border.

== See also ==
- Beagle Conflict, a border dispute between Chile and Argentina over the possession of Picton, Lennox, and Nueva islands and the scope of the maritime jurisdiction associated with those islands that brought the countries to the brink of war in 1978.
- East Patagonia, Tierra del Fuego and Strait of Magellan dispute, a border dispute between Chile and Argentina over the southernmost territories of South America.
- Boundary Treaty of 1881, a treaty signed on July 23, 1881, by Bernardo de Irigoyen and Francisco de Borja Echeverría, which sought to clarify the existing Chile–Argentina border and establish a definite border between the two countries.
- Patagonia
- Argentine Chileans
- Chilean Argentines
- Mapuche
- Culture of Argentina
- Culture of Chile
- Argentina national football team
- Chile national football team
- Anti-Chilean sentiment
- Laguna del Desierto incident
