= Patricio Lynch Island =

Island

Native name: Isla Patricio Lynch
- Location within Chile

Geography
- Coordinates: 48°37′S 75°26′W
- Adjacent to: Pacific Ocean
- Area: 561 km^{2} (217 sq mi)
- Coastline: 255.1 km (158.51 mi)
- Highest elevation: 853 m (2799 ft)

Administration
- Chile
- Region: Magallanes
- Province: Última Esperanza
- Commune: Puerto Natales

Additional information
- NGA UFI= -895422

Patricio Lynch Island is an island in the Magallanes Region. It is named after Chilean navy officer Patricio Lynch.
