= David Jewett =

American naval officer (1772–1842)

Admiral David Jewett
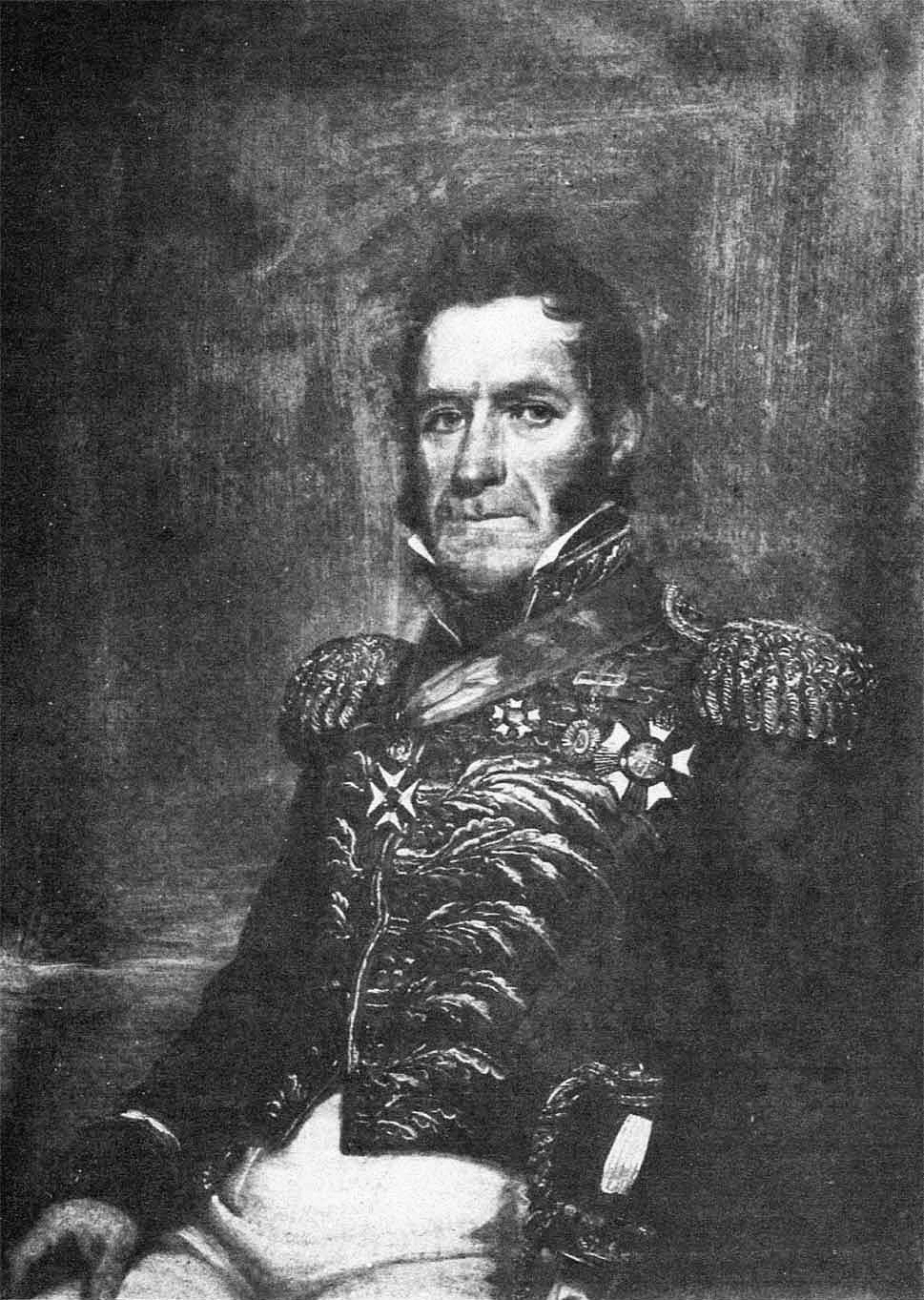
- David Jewett in Brazilian Navy uniform, c. 1825
- Born: June 17, 1772; New London (North Parish), Connecticut Colony
- Died: July 26, 1842 (aged 70); Rio de Janeiro, Empire of Brazil
- Occupation: Sailor
- Known for: Commander of the USS Trumbull in the Quasi-War with France. Claiming the Falkland Islands for the Republic of Buenos Aires in 1820. Service in the Brazilian Navy.
- Spouse: Eliza Lawrence (Mactier)
- Children: Augustine David Lawrence Jewett
- Military career
- Allegiance: United States; United Provinces; Empire of Brazil
- Branch: United States Navy; Argentine Navy; Imperial Brazilian Navy
- Rank: Master Commandant (US); Colonel (Argentina); Admiral (Brazil)
- Commands: USS Trumbull; Invincible; Heroína; Pedro I Piranga
- Conflicts: Quasi-War; War of 1812; Argentine War of Independence; Brazilian War of Independence; Cisplatine War; Uruguayan Civil War
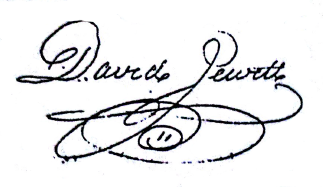
- Signature

David Jewett (June 17, 1772 – July 26, 1842) was an American-born Brazilian naval officer known for his role in the sovereignty dispute between the United Kingdom and the United Provinces of the Río de la Plata (the predecessor state of Argentina) over the Falkland Islands. He was a naval commander in the Quasi-War with France and following the end of that conflict he offered his services as a mercenary in both the United Provinces and the Empire of Brazil. Licensed as a privateer by the United Provinces to seize Spanish ships, he was later accused of piracy following the seizure of American and Portuguese flagged vessels. Jewett finished his career in the Imperial Brazilian Navy, serving under Lord Cochrane and died in Rio de Janeiro in 1842.

== Early life ==
Jewett was born in New London (North Parish), in what was then the Connecticut Colony (presently the town of Montville, Connecticut in the United States), on 17 June 1772, son of Patience Bulkley and captain David Hibbard Jewett. The family traced its paternal ancestry to Joseph Jewett, an early settler who emigrated from Yorkshire, England, to Rowley, Massachusetts, in 1638. He studied for a career in law, but after the experience of a sailing trip to Europe he changed his mind. Jewett joined the United States Navy in 1791, at age 19.

== Early career ==
Jewett, with the rank of Master Commandant, commanded the 18 gun sloop-of-war USS Trumbull in the Quasi-War with France. Following fitting out, Trumbull departed New London, Connecticut in March 1800 under his command. Its first mission was to escort the provisions ship Charlotte from New York to the West Indies, replenishing the American Squadron operating against the French. Trumbull later joined the American Squadron commanded by Silas Talbot in the USS Constitution, where the main duties in the area were protection of American shipping and the interception of French privateers and merchantmen.

Jewett was authorized as commander of the Trumbull to capture any vessel sailing under the flag of France. On April 24, 1800, it came upon the French schooner Peggy and captured it. The Peggy was returned to Connecticut where the local courts ruled her a prize of war in September 1800. The owners of the Peggy appealed for her return in the US Supreme Court case United States v. Schooner Peggy.

On August 3, while off Jérémie in Haiti, Trumbull captured the French schooner Vengeance, armed with eight or ten guns (not, as is sometimes found, the 38-gun frigate Vengeance that tangled with the USS Constellation and was later taken into the Royal Navy). The ship had fled Haiti with 130 people aboard, crew and refugees together, as Toussaint's troops took possession of the island. Talbot ordered Jewett home with Vengeance as a prize, Trumbull arriving back at New London in late summer. The Vengeance was later condemned as a national vessel and was returned to France under the treaty soon afterwards concluded with that country.

Trumbull then returned to patrol off Santo Domingo, before later transporting Navy Agent Thomas T. Gantt to St. Kitts to relieve Thomas Clarkson. Following the end of hostilities with France as a result of the Treaty of Mortefontaine, Trumbull returned to the United States in the spring of 1801, was sold later that year and her crew discharged. Jewett left the Navy but rejoined during the War of 1812 against Britain, when he acted as a privateer.

== Service to the United Provinces ==
On June 22, 1815, Jewett arrived in the port of Buenos Aires, aboard his own ship the Invincible. He offered his services to the newly independent United Provinces of the River Plate (later Argentina), which accepted his proposal and authorized his corsair activities against the Spanish. From 1815 to 1817 the Invincible made use of the letter of marque issued for her and Jewett, and four ships were captured: the polacca Tita, the frigate Santander, the brigantines Jupiter and San Antonio, all of them deemed lawful prize by the Government of the United Provinces.

In January 1820 he was appointed a Colonel in the Argentine Navy. He was given command of the frigate Heroína, a ship owned by Patrick Lynch, acting as a privateer. Jewett's activities were licensed by letter of marque that Lynch obtained from the Buenos Aires Supreme Director José Rondeau.

In March 1820 he set out on a voyage marked by misfortune, a mutiny, scurvy and piracy against Portuguese and American ships. Some 80 of his crew of 200 were either sick or dead by the time he arrived on 27 October 1820 at Puerto Soledad (later renamed Puerto Luis by Argentine settlers, it was the one-time Spanish capital of the Falkland Islands). At anchor there he found some 50 British and US sealing ships.

Captain Jewett chose to rest and recover in the islands seeking assistance from the British explorer James Weddell of the British brig Jane. Weddell reports only 30 seamen and 40 soldiers out of a crew of 200 fit for duty, and how Jewett slept with pistols over his head following an attempted mutiny for which he had executed 6 members of his crew.

=== Declaration of Possession of the Islands ===
On November 6, 1820, Col Jewett raised the flag of the United Provinces of the River Plate and claimed possession of the islands. Weddell reports the letter he received from Jewett as:

Sir, I have the honour to inform you of the circumstance of my arrival at this port, commissioned by the supreme government of the United Provinces of South America to take possession of these islands in the name of the country to which they naturally appertain. In the performance of this duty, it is my desire to act towards all friendly flags with the most distinguished justice and politeness. A principal object is to prevent the wanton destruction of the sources of supply to those whose necessities compel or invite them to visit the islands, and to aid and assist such as require it to obtain a supply with the least trouble and expense. As your views do not enter into contravention or competition with these orders, and as I think mutual advantage may result from a personal interview, I invite you to pay me a visit on board my ship, where I shall be happy to accommodate you during your pleasure. I would also beg you, so far as comes within your sphere, to communicate this information to other British subjects in this vicinity. I have the honour to be, Sir Your most obedient humble Servant, Signed, Jewett, Colonel of the Navy of the United Provinces of South America and commander of the frigate Heroína.

Many modern authors report this letter as the declaration issued by Jewett. Jewett's ship received Weddell's assistance in obtaining anchorage off of Port Louis, and, according to Weddell, "In a few days, he took formal possession of these islands for the patriot government of Buenos Ayres, read a declaration under their colours, planted on a port in ruins, and fired a salute of twenty-one guns." Weddell also linked the ceremony to Jewett's claim to the wreck of the Uranie and comments that it was calculated to make an impression on the masters of ships in the area. Weddell stated that some ship-masters were alarmed by Jewett's appearance, fearing being robbed or captured and said that one contemplated an armed response. Weddell was able to convince him Jewett was no danger and after being introduced to Jewett, he overcame his fears.

Based upon Jewett's statements in 1820, some researchers assert that he was ordered to claim the islands by Argentine authorities; others assert there is no documentary evidence to support a specific order. Jewett did not mention the claim in his 13-page request for resignation to the government of Buenos Aires, nor did the government gazette the sovereignty claim in the Gazeta de Buenos Ayres. 1820 was one of the most anarchical years in Argentine history, where there was twenty-four Governments in one year; three in one day. Other factors cited include the roundabout route Jewett took to the islands (he was eight months into the voyage when he arrived) and the fact that the declaration was only reported in Argentina as a foreign news story after being reported in the Salem Gazette in 1821. The article was also reproduced in The Times of 3 August 1821.

== Brazilian Navy career and later life ==
Jewett arrived in Rio de Janeiro in 1822 in command of the Maipu of 284-tons and armed with 18 cannons. The ship, originally named Vicuña when flying under Chilean flag had been captured by the Spanish, and subsequently by the Heroina. Jewett acquired her and in 1822 sold her to Emperor Dom Pedro I, to serve as the Caboclo. Jewett then offered to join the Brazilian Navy and was appointed commander of the frigate União on October 6, 1822.

In 1823, while under the command of Lord Cochrane (the Sea Wolf), Jewett held the rank of “Chefe de Divisão” and fought in the northern provinces of Brazil, then still sympathetic to Portugal.

Jewett was accused of misconduct, whilst in command of the ship Pedro I, and sentenced by the Supreme Military Court to 2 years of imprisonment, on May 20, 1824. He was pardoned two months later by the Emperor Pedro I.

In 1824, Jewett fought in the revolt in Pernambuco, against the rebel forces of Manuel de Carvalho Pais de Andrade. Cochrane's forces, including Jewett, took an active role in the restoration of public order.

When the Cisplatine War began in the early 1826, it was announced on April 10 that Jewett was to replace the second in command of the Imperial Navy of the Rio de la Plata, Rear Admiral Diego de Brito. However, two days later he asked for a medical licence, and the appointment never took effect.

Whilst on a trip to New York on Brazilian navy matters in 1826, Jewett married Eliza Lawrence Mactier, daughter of NYC Alderman Augustine H. Lawrence. They had a son, Augustine David Lawrence Jewett.

Jewett had recurring health issues in his last years of service, and was on a medical licence from 1828 to 1830, and for two years in 1834-1835. His last mission was carried out in 1836. He was awarded the Imperial Order of the Southern Cross for service in the Imperial Navy of Brazil.

Jewett died 26 July 1842 in Rio de Janeiro. He was interred the day after in the São Francisco de Paula church; his wife Eliza died a few months later. In 1850 his remains were relocated to the new cemetery of the Order of the Minims, in Catumbí.

== Bibliography ==
- Child, Jack. Geopolitics and Conflict in South America: Quarrels Among Neighbors. New York; Praeger, 1985, pp. 112–115. ISBN 978-0-03-001453-6.
- Gough, Barry. The Falkland Islands/Malvinas: The Contest for Empire in the South Atlantic. London: Athlone Press, 1992, pp. 55–59.
- Strange, Ian J. The Falkland Islands. London: David & Charles Press, 1983, p. 194.
