= Enrique Lynch del Solar =

Chilean painter (1863–1936)

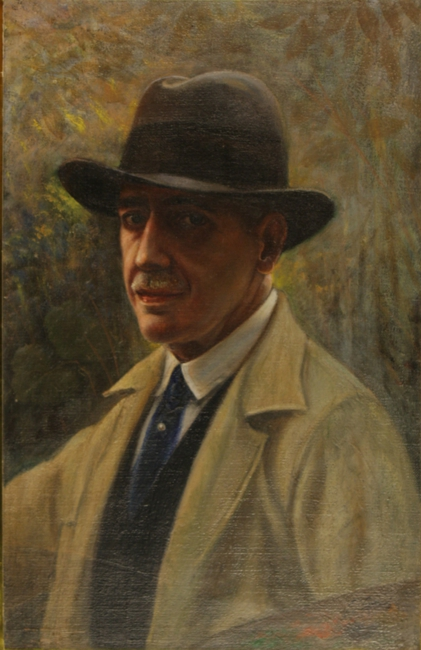
Selfportrait Enrique Lynch del Solar.

Enrique Lynch del Solar (1863 in Quillota, Chile – 1936 in Santiago de Chile) was a painter of portraits, and ocean landscapes, a pioneer of the Chilean Modernist art movement. He studied painting in Paris, France at the École des Beaux-Arts with Diogène Maillart. Upon his return to Chile, he became Director of the Chilean National Museum of Fine Arts "Museo de Bellas Artes en Parque Forestal".

== Early life ==
Enrique enjoyed a comfortable childhood among his 6 siblings, they belonged to the Chilean upper class of Santiago; his father Luis Alfredo Lynch Solo de Zaldívar was a military attache and career diplomat, and his mother Julia del Solar Cañas was an elegant lady from a prosperous Chilean family.
In his personal life, Enrique had 2 marriage engagements: first with the young Argentine art student Romualda Barrios the daughter of a winemaker from La Rioja, they had one son Nicolás, their union did not last long and ended once Enrique moved to study in France; upon graduation he returned to Chile and married Ana Waltemath the daughter of a wealthy German-Chilean family, they had a son named Luis Patricio. He issued 2 sons: his older son Nicolás Barrios-Lynch became a renowned educator in Argentina and a pioneer of the rural libraries movement across South America, while his younger son Luis Patricio Lynch Waltemath became a successful businessman in Chile.

== Artist Evolution ==
Following his father Luis Alfredo Lynch Solo de Zaldívar, during his diplomatic posting to France, Enrique took his first year of art training at the French artist Diogène Maillart studio in Paris. In 1884 he returned to Chile, and obtained his bachelor's of Fines Arts at the University of Chile with Cosme San Martín.

- In 1886, he obtained a grant from the Chilean Ministry of Education and returned to France to study at the Academy of Arts of Henri Gervex-Humbert, Académie de La Palette and at the "École des Beaux-Arts" in Paris.
- In 1890, he exhibited in the Paris Salon
- In 1891, he returned to Chile, becoming Director of the Palace of Fine Arts from 1897 to 1918.

From his director position, he undertook an arduous work in defence of the arts education and Modernist movement, next to the art professor Virginio Arias and painter Alberto Mackenna.

- In 1910, he was responsible for the inauguration and of the Palace of Fine Arts by the Forest Park. On the occasion, he curated the art collection of the Palace of Fine Arts, and organized the "International Fine Arts Exhibition in Santiago", together with the Chilean Council of Fine Arts.
