= Patrick Lynch (Galway) =

Patrick Lynch (born 1659, date of death unknown) was allegedly healed by a miracle.

== Background ==
Lynch was the son of Patrick Lynch Fitz Maurice and Redise Lynch of Galway. In 1673, aged about fourteen, he was "visited with a most grievous, desperate, and dangerous disease, and given over by all the doctors to be incurable, and could not eat one bite since Ester last, and what little sustenance of milk he would take, he presently vomited the same, so all things were prepared for his death, and no humane hopes of his recovery."

== St Augustine's Well ==
Lynch was taken to the local well of St. Augustine at Lough Atalia, on 11 June. There he was "totally dipped in the said well, having no feeling [feeling] thereof, and being brought up was wrapped by Mary Burke in a woolen plaid (woollen plaid)." He was left to sleep for about fifteen minutes till his mother woke him. He began to cry, blaming her for interrupting a vision he was having of "Our Lord Jesus Christ and his blessed mother and a multitude of brave winged birds."

Lynch asked his mother to bring him a cup of water from the well, which he drank, and was able to then get up and walk unsupported. He told his mother that he was to "visit the well neine dayes, and to drinke thereof three tymes in etech day, and that he would doe well, and douth to continue since to observe the same dayly, and since is cured of the vomitting disease, and douth eath and drink ever since with a great apetit and desire, and douth slipe well."

== Aftermath ==
An examination of all the relevant witnesses was taken on 23 June 1673 at Galway. They included Patrick and his parents—his father stating that he had prepared a coffin for his son's death—the warden of Galway, and ten other local notables, including the Priors of the Augustinians and Dominicans.
