= Robert L. Lynch =

American arts administrator

Robert L. Lynch is an American arts administrator. A former lobbyist, he formerly was president and chief executive officer of Americans for the Arts. Lynch is a subject matter expert about arts administration and government engagement in the arts. He has been featured on NPR, KCRW, and the Brian Lehrer Show and in The New York Times, Philanthropy News Digest and Truthout.

== Career ==
Prior to being an arts administer, Lynch worked as a freelance journalist, was an English teacher, and played guitar in rock bands.

Early in his arts career, Lynch was director of the University of Massachusetts Amherst's Arts Extension Service from 1976 until 1985. Lynch joined Americans for the Arts in 1985, as chief executive officer for two years. He left his position when the organization, then known as the National Assembly of Local Arts Agencies, merged with the American Council for the Arts in 1987 and retired from Americans for the Arts after Americans for the Arts was accused of not adequately responding to certain social dynamics of the arts world.

Lynch was a subject matter expert in Craft in America's Democracy episode in October 2020. In November 2020, Lynch was named to the Joe Biden transition team, as a volunteer supporting transition efforts related to the arts and humanities.
