= Ron Lynch =

Ron Lynch may refer to:

- Ron Lynch (American football) (born 1940), American football coach
- Ron Lynch (comedian) (born 1953), American stand-up comedian and actor
- Ron Lynch (cricketer) (1923–2012), English cricketer
- Ron Lynch (rugby league) (1939–2024), Australian rugby league footballer
