= Lynch-Staunton =

Lynch-Staunton is a surname. Notable people with the surname include:

- Frank C. Lynch-Staunton, AOE (1905–1990), the 11th Lieutenant Governor of Alberta from 1979 to 1985
- George Lynch-Staunton (1858–1940), lawyer and member of the Canadian Senate
- Henry Lynch-Staunton (1873–1941), British sport shooter, who competed in the 1908 Summer Olympics
- John Lynch-Staunton (1930–2012), Canadian senator and the first leader of the Conservative Party of Canada

== See also ==
- Victor Martyn Lynch-Staunton Award, monetary award given by the Canada Council for the Arts to mid-career Canadian artists
