= Diogène Maillart =

French painter

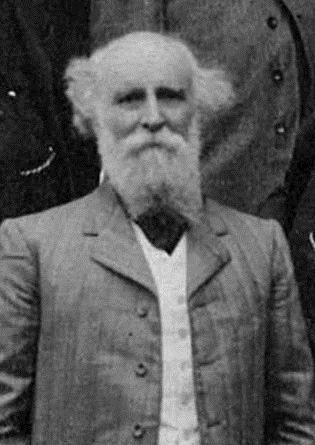
Diogène Maillart (c.1910)

Diogène Ulysse Napoléon Maillart (28 October 1840 – 3 August 1926) was a French painter, illustrator, designer, teacher and art critic.

== Biography ==
He was born in Lachaussée-du-Bois-d'Écu. His first art lessons were at the "Imperial School of Design" (a government-sponsored craft school). Later, he studied at the École des Beaux-arts in the workshop of Léon Cogniet. He won the Prix de Rome in 1864, aged only twenty-three.

After returning from Rome in 1869, he was appointed a professor of drawing at the Gobelins Manufactory, a position he occupied for fifty years. From 1873 to 1877, he was the Inspector of art works. He exhibited in the Salon every year until his death in 1926 in Paris.

After the founding of the Third Republic, he was involved in the decoration of several public buildings, including murals for Saint-Augustin Church (which had been started during the Second Empire), ceiling and staircase decorations for the Town Hall in the 3rd arrondissement and ornaments in the Bon Marché (now gone).

At the request of Prince Von Donnersmarck and his wife (known as "La Païva"), Maillart decorated the ceiling of Schloss Neudeck in Upper Silesia. The building was burned by the Red Army in 1945 and the ruins were demolished in 1961. A series of murals he created for the City Hall in Beauvais also fared poorly; being destroyed by German bombs in 1940.

In addition to his painting, he was also a prolific author, writing a work on Byzantine art and a general history of the fine arts, in two volumes (among others). He became a knight in the Légion d'honneur in 1885. His grave in the Cimetière du Montparnasse is adorned with a bust sculpted by Henri-Léon Gréber.

== Selected paintings ==
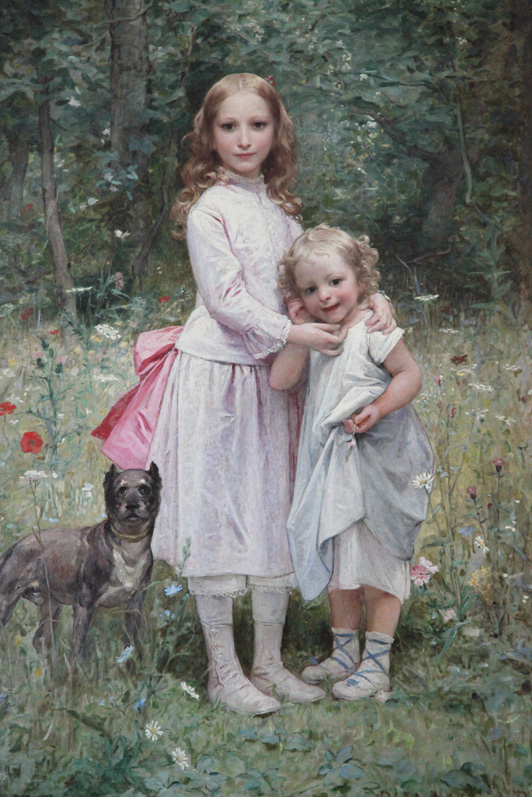
His daughters,
Eva and Jeanne

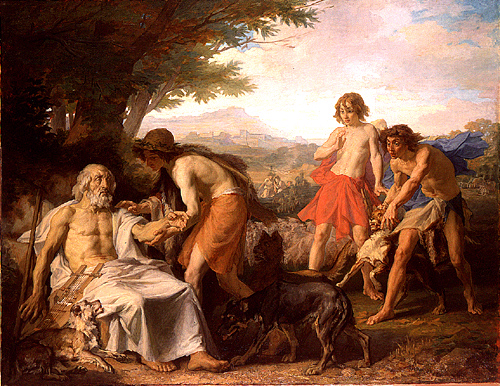
Homer on the
Island of Skyros (1864)

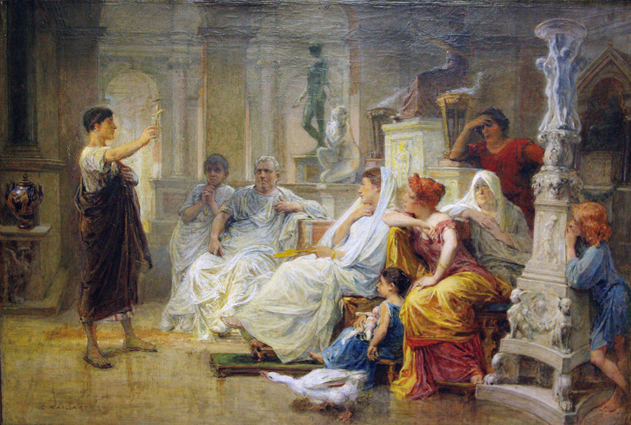
The Young Christian Neophyte (1892)

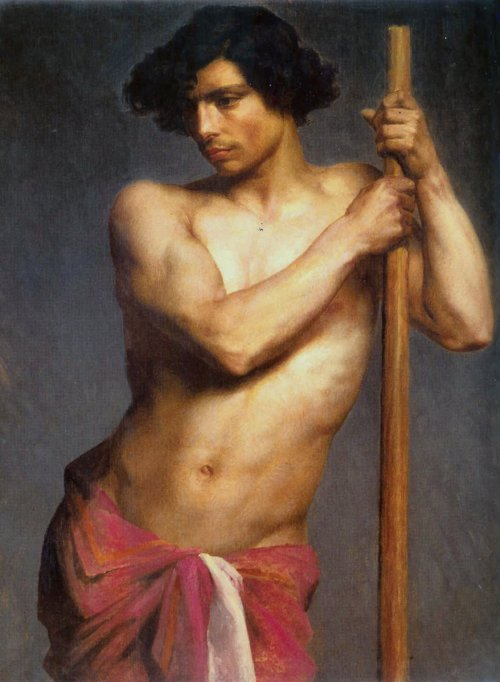
Half-nude Study
of a Young Man (1864)
