= Michael Lynch =

Michael, Mike, or Mick Lynch may refer to:

== Sport ==
- Michael Lynch (cyclist) (born 1963), Australian Olympic cyclist
- Michael Lynch (Gaelic footballer) (born 1996), Donegal goalkeeper
- Mike Lynch (outfielder) (1875–1947), outfielder for Major League Baseball
- Mike Lynch (pitcher) (1880–1927), pitcher for Major League Baseball
- Mike Lynch (rugby union) (born 1970), Irish rugby union player
- Mick Lynch (footballer) (1878–1944), Australian rules footballer

== Academics ==
- Michael Lynch (geneticist) (born 1951), professor of evolution, population genetics and genomics at Arizona State University
- Michael P. Lynch, professor of philosophy at the University of Connecticut
- Michael Lynch (ethnomethodologist) (born 1948), professor at the department of Science and Technology Studies at Cornell University
- Michael Lynch (historian) (born 1946), retired Scottish historian
- Mike Lynch (information scientist) (born 1932), professor at the University of Sheffield
- Michael Lynch (professor) (1944–1991), Canadian literature and LGBT studies academic, activist and poet

== Arts ==
- Michael Lynch (arts administrator) (born 1950), Australian arts administrator
- Mick Lynch (musician) (1959–2015), Irish musician
- Mike Lynch (cartoonist) (born 1962), American cartoonist

== Politics ==
- Michael Lynch (Irish politician) (1934–2019), Fianna Fáil politician
- Mike Lynch (Colorado politician), state representative

== Other ==
- Mike Lynch (businessman) (1965–2024), British entrepreneur and co-founder of Autonomy Corporation
- Mikey Lynch (born 1980), Australian pastor and evangelist
- Mick Lynch (trade unionist) (born 1962), leader of the British RMT union
- Michael Lynch (Irish Army officer) (1942–2008), Irish Army Commandant and UN observer

== See also ==
- Michael Lynche (born 1983), singer
