= Kathleen Lynch =

Kathleen Lynch may refer to:

- Kathleen Lynch (cyclist) (born 1957), New Zealand mountain biker
- Kathleen Lynch (politician) (born 1953), Irish politician
- Kathleen Lynch (performer), American performance artist
- Kathleen Lynch (academic) (born 1951), Irish sociologist and activist

== See also ==
- Kathleen Lynn (1874–1955), Irish physician and politician
