= Sean Lynch =

Sean or Seán Lynch may refer to:

- Seán Lynch (politician) (born 1954), Irish politician and former Provisional IRA commander
- Sean Lynch (footballer) (born 1987), Scottish footballer, currently with Airdrie United FC
- Sean Lynch (rugby union) (born 1942), Irish rugby union player
- Sean Lynch (artist) (born 1978), Irish visual artist
