= Douglas E. Lynch =

American academic administrator

Doug Lynch
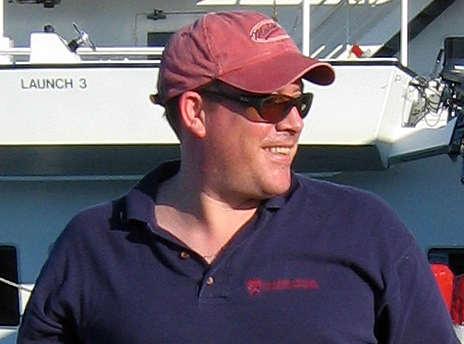
- Born: May 7, 1964 (age 62)

Douglas E. Lynch is an academic administrator and education entrepreneur who has made significant contributions to education innovation and also sparked controversy.

== Background ==
Lynch holds a B.A. in economics from Arizona State University, an M.B.A. in International Finance from the Stern School of Business at New York University, and an M.Phil. and Ph.D. in Economics and Education from Columbia University.

Doug was the vice dean at the Graduate School of Education at the University of Pennsylvania and while there also served for a time as an academic director of Wharton Executive Education and a senior adviser to the Fels Institute of Government. Prior to Penn, Doug was an assistant dean at New York University and before joining NYU, Doug worked at the College Board and Arizona State University.

== Work in Education Innovation ==
During his time at ASU, Lynch helped launch the Genesis Academy as a charter school; one of the first in the United States. At NYU, Lynch became active in adult & continuing education with a specific focus on online education. He was invited to present testimony to the U.S. Congress. In 2002, Lynch's work at NYU in exporting education was recognized by the U.S. Department of Commerce though a President's "E" Award in exporting; the first time a college was recognized for innovation in exporting.

Lynch also launched GSE films and the first movie he produced won a "Teddy" Award for best documentary. He also launched the NEST and the Milken Business Plan Competition, the largest education business plan competition in the world. He was invited to serve on American Enterprise Institute's Future of Education Reform as well as Harvard's Futures of Education Reform Initiative. In 2012, Lynch did a TED Talk on innovation.

== Work in Corporate Learning ==
At NYU, Lynch created "Corporate Learning Services" to serve employers learning needs. Working with Richard Breeden, Lynch designed and delivered all the training for WorldCom to help it emerge from sanctions and bankruptcy. He also was brought in after 9/11 to help New York City Fire Department design programs. At Penn, he created the first doctoral program designed for Chief Learning Officers. He was the chair of the American Society for Training & Development Public Policy Committee, and also chaired the US delegation to the International Standards Organization in an effort to establish global standards for all non-formal learning. As an expert in corporate learning, Lynch also served for a time on the Board of Visitors to the Central Intelligence Agency's Corporate University. In 2001, one of his programs at NYU won an HR Executive "Top 10" Award and in 2003, another program won an APX Award for Program.

== Controversy ==
In 2012, Lynch was accused of falsifying his doctorate, with an article alleging he claimed dates for a Masters in Philosophy that was not correct and for a PhD that he had not yet completed. Lynch resigned one day after the story broke in the national press. Another article that followed the controversy noted that the Penn website did not list his degrees, only that on one Penn website he was referred to as "Dr." Lynch, and in another article, it notes that he claimed he was "trained in economics" rather than having a doctorate. The Penn press release at the time of his hire, did not mention either degree but rather that he was enrolled in a doctoral program. The controversy continued a year later, where another article claimed that he continued to fake his degrees. However, the Columbia University website at the time of the article did listed him as having a PhD and with a dissertation in economics that focused on the value of diversity.
