= Eddie Lynch (American football coach) =

American college football player and coach (1899–1953)

Biographical details
- Born: November 17, 1899; Emmetsburg, Iowa, U.S.
- Died: April 13, 1953 (aged 53); Minneapolis, Minnesota, U.S.

Playing career
- 1920–1922: Dartmouth
- Position: End

Coaching career (HC unless noted)
- 1924–1925: Dartmouth (ends)
- 1926–1929: Minnesota (ends)
- 1931: Carleton
- 1932–1934: Wisconsin (ends)
- 1935–1936: Iowa (ends)

Head coaching record
- Overall: 5–2

Accomplishments and honors

Championships
- 1 MWC (1931)

Edward Bernard Lynch (November 17, 1899 – April 13, 1953) was an American college football player and coach. He served as the head football coach at Carleton College in 1931. Lynch played as an end at Dartmouth College from 1920 to 1922. He served as an assistant football coach at the University of Minnesota under head coach Clarence Spears from 1926 to 1929.

Lynch was born in Emmetsburg, Iowa. He grew up in Aberdeen, South Dakota, where he played high school football as a quarterback. In 1945, Lynch was appointed as an account executive for Merrill Lynch in Minneapolis. He died of a heart attack, on April 13, 1953, at his home in Minneapolis.

== Head coaching record ==
=== Football ===
| Year | Team | Overall | Conference | Standing | Bowl/playoffs |
|---|---|---|---|---|---|
Carleton Carls (Midwest Conference) (1931)
| 1931 | Carleton | 5–2 | 2–0 | T–1st | |
| Carleton: | | 5–2 | 2–0 | | |
| Total: | | 5–2 | | | |
National championship Conference title Conference division title or championship game berth
