= Pastorino =

Pastorino is an Italian surname. Notable people with the surname include:

- Enrique Pastorino (1918–1995), Uruguayan trade union leader and communist politician
- Giacomo Pastorino (born 1980), Italian water polo goalkeeper
- Luca Pastorino (born 1971), Italian politician
- Malvina Pastorino (1916–1994), Argentine film actress
- Pelegrina Pastorino (1902-1988), Italianf fashion reporter
- Pietro Pastorino (1900–1960s), Italian sprinter
