= Diela, Burkina Faso =

Diela
- Location in Burkina Faso
- Coordinates: 12°26′0″N 0°0′0″E
- Country: Burkina Faso
- Region: Est Region
- Province: Gnagna Province
- Department: Bilanga Department

Population (2019)
  - Total: 1,788

Diela is a town in the Bilanga Department of Gnagna Province in eastern Burkina Faso.

Population
| Year | Pop. | ±% |
|---|---|---|
| 1985 | 834 | — |
| 2006 | 1,068 | +28.1% |
| 2019 | 1,788 | +67.4% |
