= USS Trumbull (1800) =

Sloop-of-war of the United States Navy

History

United States
- Name: USS Trumbull
- Laid down: 1799
- Launched: 1800
- Commissioned: March, 1800
- Fate: Sold, 1801

General characteristics
- Type: Sloop-of-war
- Tonnage: 400
- Propulsion: Sails
- Complement: 220 officers and enlisted
- Armament: 18 × 12-pounder guns

Service record
- Commanders: Capt. David Jewett

USS Trumbull, the third United States Navy ship to bear the name, was an 18-gun sloop-of-war that took part of the so-called Quasi-War between the United States and France, between 1800 and 1801.

== Construction ==
US Congress authorized the construction of naval ships and expansion of the US Navy in response to large losses of merchant ships to French privateers throughout the Atlantic coasts. On 30 March 1799, Benjamin Stoddert ordered Howland & Allyn Naval Agency from New London, Connecticut, the construction of a 360-ton ship with no more than 18 guns, but big enough to carry supplies for 6 months of sailing and a crew of 120 men. The Trumbull was launched in Norwich, on the morning of 26 November of that same year.

== Service history ==
Following fitting out, it departed New London in March 1800 under the command of Master Commandant David Jewett. Its first mission was to escort the provisions ship Charlotte from New York to the West Indies, replenishing the American Squadron operating against the French.

Trumbull joined the American Squadron commanded by Silas Talbot in the USS Constitution. Trumbull's main duties in the area were protection of American shipping and the interception of French privateers and merchantmen.

In early May 1800, she captured the armed French schooner, Peggie. This may have been the schooner of six guns, that had been sailing from Port Republican to Bordeaux with 70,000wt. of coffee. By the end of the War she still hadn't been tried in Court, so she was returned to her owners.

In August 1800 Trumbull, Augusta, andHerald were cruising near Aux Cayes.

On 3 August, while off Jeremie in Saint-Domingue (future Haiti), Captain David Jewett and Trumbull captured the French privateer schooner Vengeance. Vengeance was pierced for 10 guns but armed with eight 4-pounder guns and two in her hold. (Note: This was not, as is sometimes found, the 38-gun frigate HMS Vengeance that tangled with the USS Constellation and was later taken into the Royal Navy.) The schooner was fleeing Jeremie, Saint-Domingue at the fall of the port to forces of Gen. Toussaint with 130 people aboard, crew and refugees together. The refugees were mostly gens de couleur libres (also known as mulattos), 60-70 of those were Officers, including D'Artignave, Commandant of Jeremie, an Adjutant General, and Riguad's staff escaping the forces of Toussaint Louverture who had defeated André Rigaud's army in the War of Knives. Also captured at the same time was an open boat carrying the Commandant of Petit Trou and other Officers. Talbot ordered Jewett home with Trumbull and Vengeance as a prize. Both ships were ordered to Norfolk, Va. but sailed on to New London, Connecticut, arriving by 20 September. For a little less than a year, those aboard the Vengeance were stationed in Norwich, Connecticut as prisoners of war, and among them was Jean-Pierre Boyer, future president of Haiti. Vengeance was later condemned as a national vessel and was returned to France under the treaty soon afterwards concluded with that country.

Trumbull then returned to patrol off Santo Domingo, before later transporting Navy Agent Thomas T. Gantt to St. Kitts to relieve Thomas Clarkson. Following the end of hostilities with France as a result of the Treaty of Mortefontaine, Trumbull returned to the United States about 20 March 1801, where her crew was paid off. In a letter dated 20 February 1801 to Josiah Parker, chairman of the Committee on Naval Affairs, Navy Secretary Stoddert recommended selling her.

Disposal: Trumbull was sold at auction in New York in May or June 1801 for $26,500 to Messrs. Robinson and Harthorne, local merchants.

== Bibliography ==
- Allen, Gardner Weld (1909). Our naval war with France.
  Houghton Mifflin, Boston, New york. p. 323. OCLC 197401914. Url
- Demerliac, Alain (1999). La Marine de la Révolution: Nomenclature des Navires Français de 1792 à 1799 (in French). Éditions Ancre. ISBN 9782906381247. OCLC 492783890.
