= Robert Clyde Lynch =

American physician

Robert Clyde Lynch (1880 - 1931) was a physician from the United States.

== Biography ==
Lynch was born in Carson City, Nevada.

== Career ==
He made important contributions related to otolaryngology, a special field of medicine that deals with the ears, nose and throat. He improved on the surgical procedure known as the Lynch operation, a frontal sinus operation. He was the first to film motion pictures of the larynx and the vocal cords.
