= Estanislao Lynch =

Argentine naval officer (1793–1849)

Estanislao José Antonio Lynch y Roo (1793–1849), was an Argentine army officer and businessman, who took part of the Argentina War of Independence. Estanislao was the grandson of an Irish immigrant, Patrick Lynch, and the third son of Justo Pastor Lynch (1755–1830) and Ana Bernardo Roo (d. 1836).

== Career ==
Born in Buenos Aires, Lynch moved to Santiago de Chile in 1808, where he studied laws. He became a partner of David DeForest, an American arms trader, sharing 30% of the business. On 2 January 1817 the Buenos Aires city council appointed Estanislao Lynch as major of Barracas. Later that year, Lynch enlisted in the Argentine Army of the Andes, and offered financial and material support to commander-in-chief Jose de San Martin. After the army victory at Chacabuco, San Martin named him his personal secretary, with the rank of colonel, in February 1818. In 1821, Lynch married Carmen Solo de Zaldívar y Rivero, a lady from the Chilean high-society just before joining San Martin forces in their military campaign in Peru.

== Family ==
Eventually, Lynch retired from the army and expanded the family's businesses to Valparaíso, Chile, where he settled with his wife and issued:

- Luis Alfredo Lynch, naval officer
- Patricio Lynch, appointed Chilean Ambassador to Spain, previously a naval officer in the Chilean Navy reaching the rank of admiral.
- Julio Angel Lynch, naval officer
