= Richard Linche =

English poet

Richard Linche (or Lynche; fl. 1596–1601) was an English poet.

He was the author of The Fountaine of English Fiction (1599). In this "strange borne child of idlenesse," as he called it, the author took each of the Latin gods in turn, and then collated from classical writers the passages in which his attributes are described. It is dedicated to "Peter Dauison, esq." Linche also authored An Historical Treatise of the Travels of Noah into Europe (1601). Dedicated to "My very good friend, Maister Peter Manwood, Esq." Both of these so-called translations are interspersed with verses and with tags of Italian. These circumstances, combined with a general similarity of style and colouring, strongly favour the conjecture that Linche is the "R. L. gentleman" who in 1596 gave to the world Diella; certain Sonnets adioyned to the amorous Poeme of Dom Diego and Gineura, the publisher of Philip Sidney's Apologie for Poetrie. Heber (Cat. of Engl. Poetry, p. 171) describes the volume as of extraordinary rarity; but besides the one in his possession there are copies both in the British Museum and Bodleian Libraries; the latter, although dated 1596, bears a different imprint. The printer's dedication is addressed to Lady Ann Glemnham, eldest daughter of Thomas Sackville, Earl of Dorset, and wife of Sir Henry Glemnham or Glemham, knight. Despite the writer's "immaturity" (to which allusion is made in the preface) the sonnets display some genuine, though ill-sustained inspiration, according to Thomas Seccombe. The story of "Dom Diego" is taken bodily from the Tragicall Discourses (1567) of Geoffrey Fenton. The thirty-eight sonnets alone were reprinted in 1841 at the Beldornie Press for Edward V. Utterson (sixteen copies only), and also in E. Goldsmid's Bookworms Garner, and together with "Dom Diego" in the seventh volume of Mr. Arber's English Garner (1883). The whole work was edited in 1877, with introduction and notes, by the Rev. A. B. Grosart, who was convinced of the identity of R. L. with Richard Linche. The attribution of Diella to Richard Lylesse, scholar of King's College, Cambridge, advanced by Messrs. Cooper (Athenæ Cantabr. ii. 223) has certainly less to recommend it.

Linche may have been the subject of the sonnet which Richard Barnfield addressed to his "friend, Maister R. L., in praise of Musique and Poetrie," in Poems in Diuers Humors (1598). A poem in the Paradise of Dainty Devices, entitled "Being in Love he complaineth," bears the same signature.
