= Nicolás Barrios-Lynch =

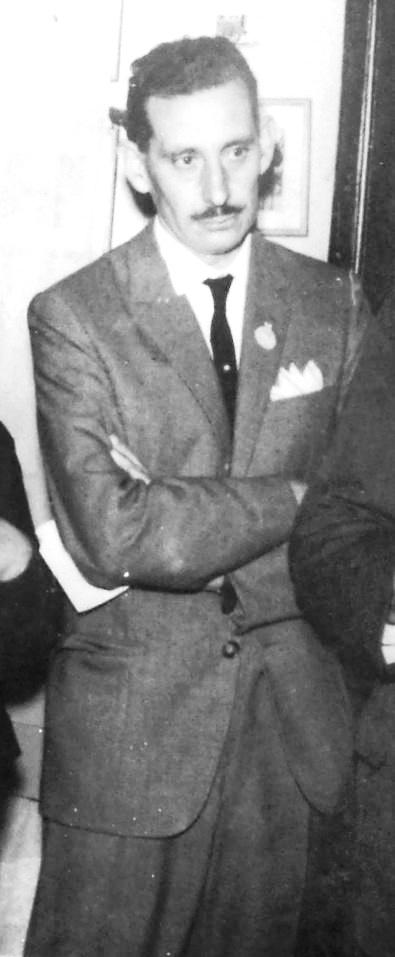
Nicolás Barrios-Lynch (1968).

Nicolás Barrios-Lynch (1910–1986) was an Argentine educator and pioneer of the rural libraries movement across South America. After his teaching career, he became a dedicated promoter of public and rural libraries, and the inclusion of foreign books and texts of Argentine original peoples literature in public education, spreading commercial education for entrepreneurship of educational tourism, became Director of Rural Education programs at the Ministry of Public Transportation, and at Argentina's Ministry of Education contributing in philanthropic initiatives for the sustainability of the National Library of Teachers located at the Sarmiento Palace.

== Early life ==
He was born in Chilecito, La Rioja, the first son of Argentine arts student Romualda Barrios and Chilean artist Enrique Lynch del Solar. Upon his birth his father moved to France, eventually his mother re- marriage to Dr. Alfredo Palacios who would become his father figure. From his paternal family, he maintained relation with his distant cousins of his own age, his youngest cousin renowned writer Adolfo Bioy Casares and his older cousin naturist Enrique Lynch Arribálzaga, both members of the Lynch Clan in Argentina.

== Career evolution ==
Completing his studies at the National College of Buenos Aires, Nicolás obtained his teacher's degree, which allowed him to accept a job in the public education system, first taking teacher posts in rural schools, which allowed him to know the interior of the country and live for some years in Chubut teaching in Welsh schools. After this work experience, he would return to study at the University of Buenos Aires, where he received his Bachelor of Arts in Philosophy and Letters. At this point in his life, he began his essayist activity, writing texts under pseudonyms or for other writers known as a ghostwriter, a task that led him to enter circles of "porteño intellectuals" (Intellectuals of Downtown Buenos Aires) of the time by the hand of his cousin Adolfo Bioy Casares who invited him to participate in Sur magazine, a literary magazine of Victoria Ocampo through who would meet his future wife, fashion journalist "Péle" Pelegrina Pastorino. He also collaborated in editorials of the magazine Martín Fierro, and with Lino Palacio in Caras & Caretas editions. At the end of his studies, Nicolás completed his work as a professor in the Faculty of Philosophy and Letters, where his stepfather has always had great influence, so he decided to change his career path and entered the Argentine Public Service eventually becoming Director of Public Schools Libraries and a Pioneer in the sustainable development of the Chilecito's ecotourism.

== Legacy ==
His legacy was the creation of the Teachers Rural Libraries movement linked to the pioneering project of eco-educational-tourism by the "Cablecarril de Chilecito" an aerial tramway in La Rioja Province of Argentina; in addition collaborated with books, the spread of Esperanto, and support for the famous Modernist and Pop artist Marta Minujín in the creation of the Parthenon of Books and the Babel Tower of Books in Buenos Aires to promote freedom and literacy through reading in the world.
