= Patricio Lynch =

Chilean naval officer

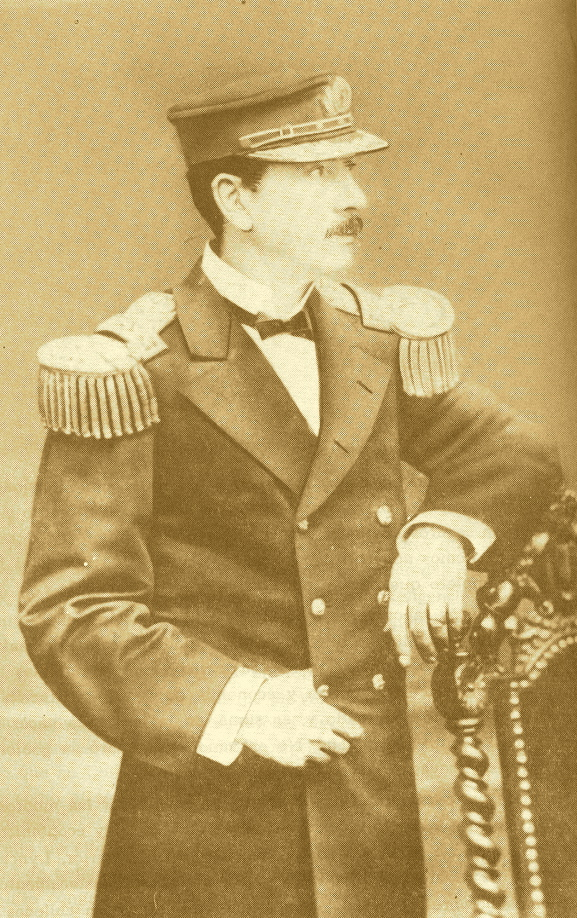
Rear-Admiral Patricio Lynch

Patricio Javier de los Dolores Lynch y Solo de Zaldívar (18 December 1825 in Valparaíso – 13 May 1886) was a lieutenant in the Royal Navy and a rear admiral in the Chilean Navy, and one of the principal figures of the later stages of the War of the Pacific. He has been nicknamed the "Last Viceroy of Peru", and the Chinese slave-labourers he liberated from the Peruvian haciendas called him the "Red Prince" (Chinese: 红公子; pinyin: Hóng gōngzǐ; Spanish: El Príncipe Rojo) because of his red hair.

== Early years ==
Lynch was born in the port of Valparaíso, Chile, the son of Estanislao Lynch y Roo, a wealthy Argentine merchant resident in Chile and of Carmen Solo de Zaldívar y Rivera. His father, a former Colonel in the Army of the Andes, had settled in Chile from Argentina and was a grandson of Patrick Lynch, an emigrant from Galway to Buenos Aires in the 1740s. His connection to Patrick Lynch makes him a distant relative of Che Guevara.

Entering the navy in 1837, at the age of 12, he took part in the Battle of Socabaya in 1838, during the War of the Confederation that led to the fall of Marshal Andrés de Santa Cruz. Next, he sought a wider field, and saw active service in the First Opium War on board the British frigate HMS Calliope and the third rate ship of the line HMS Blenheim. He was mentioned in despatches for bravery, and received the grade of midshipman in the Royal Navy. He would stay after the Opium War for five years and learnt to speak fluent Chinese, which became useful for his future adventure.

Returning to Chile in 1847, he became a lieutenant. Seven years later he received the command of a frigate, but was later relieved of his command for refusing to allow arrested political suspects on board. The Chincha Islands War saw him again employed, and he was successively maritime Prefect of Valparaiso, colonel of National Guards, and finally captain and minister of marine in 1872.

== War years ==
At the beginning of the War of the Pacific, Lynch was a Naval Commander. He asked for a position in the navy, but was refused due to the opposition of his fellow officers. He retaliated by asking for a position in the Army, but instead was named as Commander General of Transports, where he was able to show his great abilities as an organizer. In early September 1880, he led a raid against northern Peru to gather ransom payments from business and sugar plantation owners, that has become known as the "Lynch Expedition".

"Many Chinese saw the Chilean liberation as an opportunity to avenge years of abuse from the plantation owners; in Pacasmayo 600 to 800 Chinese forced labourers looted the sugar estates and this scene was repeated in the Chicama, Lambayeque and Cañete Valleys. The Chinese also fought alongside the Chileans in the battles of San Juan-Chorrillis and Miraflores, and there was also rioting and looting by non-Chinese workers in the coastal cities. As Heraclio Bonilla has observed; oligarchs soon came to fear the popular clashes more than the Chileans, and this was an important reason why they sued for peace". [Source: "From chattel slaves to wage slaves: dynamics of labour bargaining in the Americas", by Mary Turner.]

During the "Lynch Expedition", he recruited Chinese peons who worked in the haciendas, and was able to convince them to join the army as an auxiliary force, his success in convincing the Chinese to join up was made possible by the Chinese language he had learned in the Opium War.

In the final campaign that led to the capture of Lima, he participated in the battles of Chorrillos and Miraflores (January 1881), in which he led first a brigade (as colonel) and afterwards a division under General Baquedano. His services at the battle of Chorrillos led to his appointment as Supreme Military and Political Commandant of Peru in 1881.

During the time he was Commander of the Army of Occupation, his action in deporting the acting Peruvian president Francisco García Calderón to Chile, excited considerable comment by many Peruvian aristocrats, and the active opposition of the US government that almost led to a military conflict with that country. He returned to his own country in 1883 after the Treaty of Ancón was signed.

== Later years ==
Promoted to rear-admiral, in 1884 he was designated as Chilean minister plenipotentiary (ambassador) to Madrid. His mission was to negotiate a definitive peace treaty with Spain to end the Chincha Islands War. Taking sick, he asked for leave to return to Chile. He died at sea on the return trip, off the Tenerife coast, on 13 May 1886.

== In popular culture ==
A movie about him, The Red Prince, which was coproduced by China and Chile, was released on 17 September 2023 in honour of Patricio Lynch.

== See also ==
- Irish military diaspora
- Patricio Lynch Island

Political offices
Preceded by Carlos Castellón	Minister of War and Navy; 1884	Succeeded by Carlos Antúnez
