= Antonio Rivero =

19th-century Argentine gaucho

Antonio "El Gaucho" Rivero (fl. 1829–1834) was a gaucho who had a leading role in the Port Louis Murders of 26 August 1833, in which five prominent members of the settlement of Port Louis on the Falkland Islands were murdered. In Argentine revisionist historiography and public consciousness, Rivero is viewed as a patriotic hero who rebelled against British authority. However, academic historians both in Argentina and abroad agree that Rivero's actions were not motivated by patriotism, but by disputes over pay and working conditions with the representatives of Louis Vernet, the former Argentine Political and Military Commander of the islands.

== Biography ==
Ventura Pasos correspondence with Luis Vernet regarding the Lexington Raid. Vernet has added the annotation in his own hand "Don Ventura Pasos was a nephew of the distinguished Argentine Don Juan Jose Pasos who, with senores Chiclana and Saavedra, formed the Triumvirate which governed in the early part of the emancipation from Spain His eldest sister is married to the eldest brother of my wife Colonel Don Domingo Saez – Don Ventura and my other agents were murdered in Aug[ust] 1833 by some Indians mentioned by him in the above letter and some runaway sailors. Don Ventura was one of the principal settlers at Port Louis".

Rivero's place of birth, like almost all other details of his life outside the events of 1833–1834, is unknown. Argentine historians generally state he was born in today's Entre Ríos Province, then part of Viceroyalty of the Río de la Plata, now in Argentina. However, no documentation exists to support this assertion.

Rivero's presence on the islands is first recorded in Emilio Vernet's diary on 18 May 1829. He was taken to the Falkland Islands by Luis Vernet, to work as a gaucho. Conditions of employment caused discontent among Vernet's workers. They were paid with promissory notes which Matthew Brisbane, Vernet's deputy, devalued by 60% following the reduction in Vernet's fortunes. On 26 August 1833, five Indian convicts and three gauchos led by Rivero embarked on a killing spree which resulted in the deaths of Brisbane and the senior leaders of the settlement. Thomas Helsby, a clerk in the employ of Vernet, wrote an account of the murders.

At around ten in the morning, Helsby departed Brisbane's house to buy some oil from William Dickson, whom he found at the house of Antonio Wagner. Other people there included Daniel McKay and Joseph Douglas. On leaving, as he passed the house of Santiago Lopez, Helsby encountered the murderers. The gang was led by Rivero and comprised the gauchos José María Luna, Juan Brasido and the five Charrúa Indians Manuel Gonzales, Luciano Flores, Manuel Godoy, Felipe Salagar and Lattorre. They were armed with "muskets, pistols, swords, dirks and knives".

Alarmed, Helsby ran to Brisbane's house for aid, but he found it locked and could raise no response. He was informed by other residents that Brisbane had been killed, along with Juan Simon (the Capatáz or foreman of the Gauchos). A third man, Don Ventura, had been left for dead, wounded in the throat by a musket, his head split and his hand almost severed by a sword, but he had since escaped by a back window and headed toward the house of Antonina Roxa. Helsby then heard two musket shots from the house of Antonio Wagner: Wagner and Dickson had been killed, witnessed by Joseph Douglas and Daniel McKay.

The gang then returned to Brisbane's house to find Ventura missing. After a brief search they found him. Ventura tried to flee, but was shot down. Helsby witnessed the murder and attempted his own escape, but was soon caught by Felipe Salagar, who was on horseback. Convinced he was about to be killed, he complied with their instructions, and was allowed to live.

I was ordered by them into Captain Brisbane's house, and there first saw his body lying dead upon the floor, he appeared to have been making towards his pistols before he fell, and there was smile of contempt or disdain very strongly marked in his countenance. They dragged his body with a horse to a considerable distance, and plundered the house.

The population of that time, mainly women and children, fled to the nearby Peat island (today Hog Island), until rescued by the sealer Hopeful in October 1833, which then passed information about the murders to the British squadron at Rio de Janeiro.

In January 1834, the British ship HMS Challenger arrived in the islands, bringing Lt. Henry Smith, who set out to capture the murderers, who fled into the interior. The gang was sent for trial in London, but under the British Legal system could not be tried because the Crown Court did not have jurisdiction over the Falkland Islands at the time of the alleged offences. In the British colonial system, colonies had their own, distinct governments, finances, and judicial systems. Rivero was not tried and sentenced because the British local government and local judiciary had not yet been installed in 1834; these were created later, by the 1841 British Letters Patent. Subsequently, Rivero has acquired the status of a folk hero in Argentina, where he is portrayed as leading a rebellion against British rule. However, all five of the victims of the massacre were employees of Vernet. They were deported to Rio de Janeiro, and returned later to the zone of the Río de la Plata.

The circumstances of Rivero's death are unknown.

== Victims ==
Rivero and his associates were responsible for the deaths of five individuals of various nationalities, all employees of Louis Vernet with close links to the United Provinces of the Rio de la Plata.

=== Matthew Brisbane ===
Matthew Brisbane (born in Perth, Scotland in 1787) was a Scottish merchant Captain, sealer and Antarctic explorer who made several voyages to the South Atlantic in the 1820s. He met Louis Vernet in 1827 when chartering a ship to rescue the survivors of the wreck of the Hope, which had run aground off South Georgia under Brisbane's command.

Following another shipwreck in Patagonia in 1830, Brisbane escaped on a makeshift boat to Port Louis in West Falkland, where he became Vernet's director of fisheries and his chief representative in the islands when Vernet was in Buenos Aires. He attempted to enforce Vernet's exclusion of American sealers from Falklands waters, leading to the seizure of two American ships. This action resulted in the 1831 attack on Port Louis by the American naval sloop the USS Lexington, after which Brisbane and six others were arrested on charges of piracy and taken to Montevideo, where they were released. Brisbane returned to the Falklands in 1832 as a pilot for the Argentine naval vessel, the Sarandí, where he was present at the Reassertion of British sovereignty over the Falkland Islands.

He travelled to Buenos Aires in the Sarandí in January 1833, before returning to the Falklands in March to resume his position as Vernet's agent in Port Louis. Upon his return he met Robert Fitzroy and Charles Darwin and is mentioned in the diaries of both men.

=== Juan Simon ===
Juan (or Jean) Simon was a French or South American gaucho, who became foreman of the gauchos employed by Louis Vernet. He was prominent in the suppression of a mutiny by members of the Argentine garrison of the islands in 1832. Upon the expulsion of the Argentine garrison in 1833, José María Pinedo appointed Simon as the Argentine Political and Military Commander of the islands, but Simon appears not to have attempted to act in any such capacity. He played a role in persuading the gauchos to remain on the islands, and his conflict with Rivero may be linked to the British commander Captain Onslow's broken promise that the gauchos would be paid in silver rather than promissory notes. He left a son, conceived with Carmelita Penny, one of the Afro-Argentine slaves brought to the islands by Vernet.

=== William Dickson ===
William Dickson (born Dublin, 1805) was an Irish shopkeeper who was a leading member of Vernet's colony at Port Louis. He had been living in Buenos Aires prior to his voyage to the islands. When the British expelled the Argentine garrison in 1833, he was entrusted with a Union Jack and instructed to raise it every Sunday and whenever a ship entered the bay. Vernet wrote personally to his family in Dublin to advise them of his murder.

=== Don Ventura Pasos ===
Ventura Pasos, or possibly Luciano Ventura Pasos, was an Argentine, sent to the islands by Vernet in March 1833. He was related to Vernet by marriage, Pasos' sister being married to the elder brother of Vernet's wife, María Sáez de Vernet. He was also the nephew of Juan José Paso, an Argentine politician who formed part of the first and second triumvirates that governed the United Provinces of Rio de la Plata during their war of independence.

=== Antonio Wagner ===
Antonio Wagner (or Vehingar) was a trader of German extraction and had spent some time in Buenos Aires.

== Legacy ==
The initial British plans for the Falklands were based on the perpetuation of Vernet's settlement, backed by an annual visit by a warship. This was the standard practice of maintaining a settlement with the minimum of expense. Thus, there was no British presence in the islands at the time of the Port Louis murders. A direct result of the murders was the installation of a permanent British Government presence – Lt Henry Smith became the first British resident in January 1834. Subsequently, the permanent presence led to the decision in 1841 to form a permanent colony rather than a minor naval outpost.

== In popular culture ==
Armando S. Fernández wrote in 2008 a historical novel about Rivero, called "El Gaucho Rivero y la conspiración para apoderarse de Malvinas".

In 2011 and 2012, starting at Tierra del Fuego Province, Argentine provinces with shores to the Atlantic Ocean passed a bill that banned ships sailing under the British flag from docking in their ports. These laws were collectively known as Ley Gaucho Rivero, as originally named in Tierra del Fuego, after Antonio Rivero.

In 2015, a new banknote was issued by the Argentine government themed on the Falkland Islands. In the reverse, Antonio Rivero is depicted on a horse flying the flag of Argentina.
