= Antonina Roxa =

Falkland Islander

- Born: c. 1807
- Died: 14 February 1869; Stanley, Falkland Islands
- Resting place: Stanley Cemetery
- Monuments: Antonina Vale, near Port Louis, Falkland Islands
- Citizenship: Falkland Islander
- Known for: Falklands Landowner, survivor of the Port Louis massacre (Gaucho Murders)
- Partner(s): Kenney (possibly Kinney), Pedro Varela

Antonina Roxa was one of the first Falkland Islanders whose residence in the islands predated the British return in 1833. Roxa first travelled to the islands in 1830 and was part of Luis Vernet's original colony. After the British return she became a landowner and businesswoman. She died of cancer in 1869.

== Early life ==
The exact circumstances of Roxa's birth are not known for certain and it is uncertain whether she was born in what is now Argentina or Uruguay. An article in the Launceston Advertiser, Tasmania of 19 June 1836 describes her as "Antonina, an Indian of Salta by birth."

Her date of birth is generally given as c. 1807 and she was reputed to have been a princess as the daughter of an aboriginal chief. However, most contemporary sources describe her as of South American heritage.

== Falklands ==
Roxa arrived in the Falkland Islands in 1830, during the period in which Luis Vernet was establishing a settlement at Port Louis (Spanish: Puerto Luis) in the ruins of the former Spanish penal colony of Puerto Soledad (previously the French settlement of Fort St. Louis). When the majority of the population chose to leave following the raid of the USS Lexington in 1831, Roxa was one of a group of c. 24 individuals who chose to remain in the islands. These individuals continued to trade on behalf of Vernet but Vernet refused to return as Military and Civil Commander in the Islands.

In October 1832, the ARA Sarandí commanded by Major José María Pinedo arrived to install Major Esteban Mestivier as the new Military and Civil Commander in the Islands . In November 1832, shortly after the Sarandí departed on patrol the garrison mutinied and murdered Mestivier. Order was restored by the crews of the British sealer Rapid (Note: The Rapid was at the time chartered by Adjutant Gomila to return the mutineers to the mainland.) and the French whaler Jean Jacques. When the Sarandí returned in December, Pinedo took control of the settlement. In January 1833, HMS Clio arrived and her captain, James Onslow, informed Pinedo he was there to reassert British sovereignty and requested that Pinedo leave with the garrison. Pinedo departed on 4 January 1833 in the Sarandí followed by the Rapid the next day taking the garrison to Buenos Aires. Of the persons present in the remains of Vernet's settlement, four chose to leave in the Rapid leaving twenty-three residents in the now renamed Port Louis. HMS Clio did not remain long, staying only ten days and sailing after placing William Dickson in charge of the settlement. Roxa again chose to remain in the settlement and is listed by Thomas Helsby (Vernet's clerk) as one of the residents in the islands.

Vernet sent Matthew Brisbane back to the Falklands to run his affairs, he arrived in March 1833, during the first visit of HMS Beagle. The Gaucho's wished to be paid in Silver as Captain Onslow of the Clio had promised but Brisbane continued with Vernet's policies. This led to a dispute over pay and resulted in the so-called Gaucho Murders of August 1833 in which Brisbane, Dickson and three other senior members of the settlement were murdered. Roxa and other survivors of the killing spree fled to Hog Island where they remained until Lt. Smith was installed as the British resident in 1834

After the murderers had been captured and removed from the Falkland Islands Roxa was one of only fourteen residents who remained from Vernet's settlement. Roxa, who was a skilled Gaucho in her own right, made a deal with Lt. Smith that if she could convert the feral cattle of the islands into a milking herd she could keep every second calf.

Roxa was considered a key member of a small community, in 1839 Lt. Lowcay stated that:

she was of a humane Disposition, and herself very useful on the Island when any of the Settlers were sick, and particularly in Midwifery cases, and that she had some Time back saved the Life of a young Gentleman of the Cleopatra when the Ship was at the Islands.

— Lt. Lowcay,

The deal with Lt.Smith proved to be a shrewd move as by this arrangement she accrued a large herd of cattle. This grew to a point where the Admiralty became concerned and passed a query to Governor Moody who ruled she should keep the cattle. In his report to London he stated:

I have considered it advisable to employ her as a gaucho in the field, being an active person riding as a man and tolerably skilled in the use of the lasso

— Governor Richard Moody,

On 1 January 1841, along with one other native of South America and also a native of Hamburg, Roxa swore allegiance to The Crown becoming a British citizen and was later mentioned by Governor Rennie as a foreigner who wished to be naturalised.

The 1842 Statistical Table records Roxa as owning 6 dogs, 17 cows, 6 calves, 7 oxen, 6 fowls and a well built two-room stone cottage. The 1843 census records that Roxa owned 1/6 acre, several houses, ten cattle and forty sheep. When under Governor Richard Moody the seat of Government moved to Stanley it is recorded Roxa owned a plot of land and property worth £30.

In the late 1840s, she found employment as a nurse employed by Sir Bartholomew Sullivan but his son describes how her fondness of drink lead to her undoing.

The historian David Tatham reports her marrying Pedro Varela in 1851, after which she found employment in the Falkland Islands Company farm at Hope Place. She leased, in her own name, a station of 6,000 acres (2,428 ha) for £5 near San Carlos.

Roxa died of cancer in 1869 and was buried in the cemetery in Stanley.

== Personal life ==
At some point in the 1830s Roxa married an American sailor named Kenney (or Kinney) but they were divorced by Lt. Smith in May 1838. As reported by David Tatham, she married a Gaucho Pedro Varela c. 1851, a man ten years her junior, however, there is no formal record of a marriage in either the Government or Church registers.

Roxa is also believed to be romantically involved with one of the soldiers involved in the mutiny against Mestivier. In a letter to the Lord Glenelg, Mr. Harger the purser of HMS Cleopatra wrote:

"The Spanish woman’s first husband was a soldier, he was concerned in a murder and executed at Buenos Ayres – her second was murdered on the island – her third is an American.
She is a rather good looking woman, does not appear more than thirty, and in bodily and mental qualities is well calculated for the society she lives in – she rides fearlessly… she shoots well. When her second spouse and four others suffered – she led the two black women, and two or three men, across the island, and with the aid of her gun procured them food until it was safe to return."
