= Matthew Brisbane =

Scottish mariner and sealer

- Born: 1787; Perth, Scotland
- Died: 26 August 1833 (aged 45–46); Port Louis, Falkland Islands
- Occupations: Mariner, sealer

Matthew Brisbane (1787 – 26 August 1833) was a Scottish mariner, sealer and notable figure in the early history of the Falkland Islands.

== Early life ==
Little is known of Brisbane's early life. He was born in Perth, Scotland in 1787 but his exact birth date is unknown. It appears that he was a merchant sailor during the Napoleonic Wars but there is no record of his service in the Royal Navy. His brother was the master of a brig that traded between Liverpool and Quebec.

== Antarctic exploration ==
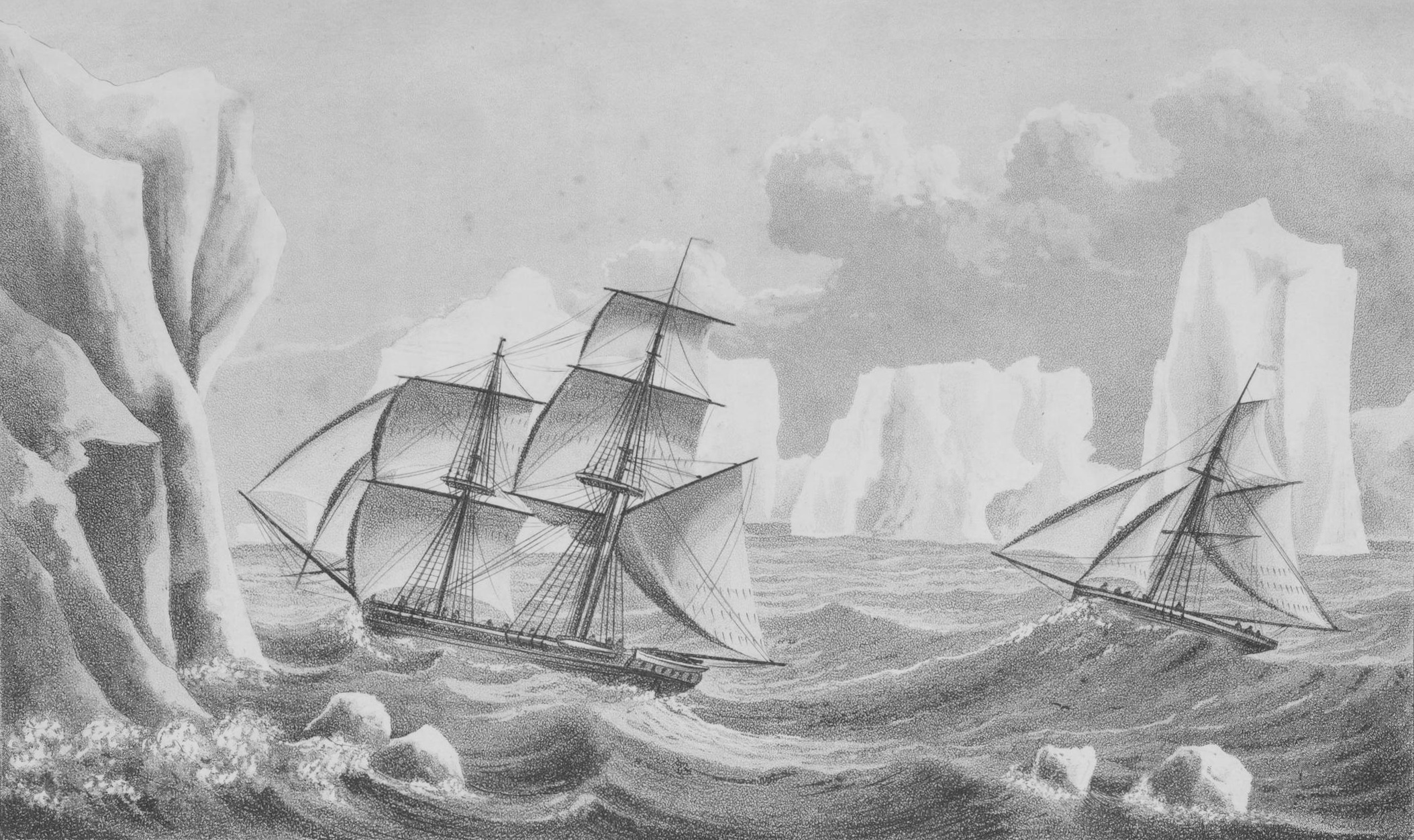
James Weddell's second expedition, depicting the brig Jane and the cutter Beaufoy.

Brisbane first rose to public attention though his association with James Weddell, the famous Antarctic explorer. Brisbane was the commander of the small cutter Beaufoy with a crew of thirteen; the Beaufoy being owned by Weddell. Weddell in the Jane and Brisbane in the Beaufoy left England on 17 September 1822. Weddell initially sailed for Madeira for provisions for the Antarctic voyage, whilst Brisbane headed for Bonavista in the Cape Verde islands for a cargo of salt with which to cure seal skins. In December, they met up at Port St Elena in what is now Chile. Brisbane sailed south to hunt for seals arranging to rendezvous with Weddell at Penguin Island on the Patagonian coast. On New Year's Day 1823, they met up once again before sailing south to the South Orkney Islands. Discovered by Nathaniel Brown Palmer and George Powell in 1821, little was known at the time about the islands and Weddell intended to explore them for seals and to conduct a hydrographic survey. They arrived in the islands on 12 January 1823 and began sealing but with little success. Brisbane conducted a rough survey of the southern coasts of the islands and in response Weddell named the cliffs on the north point of Powell Island Brisbane's Bluff (now known as Cape Faraday). Weddell and Brisbane sailed further south in the hope of finding more islands but made slow progress due to the combination of adverse weather and the need to heave to at night to avoid collision with ice floes. By 27 January they had reached 64° 58' S, where the decision was made to sail north to look for islands between the South Orkney and South Sandwich Islands. Finding none, the pair headed south again and on 20 February 1823 reached 74° 15' S, setting a record for the furthest voyage south that lasted till James Clark Ross's voyage of 1842.

== Sealing ==
During the voyage around the South Orkney Islands the expedition had tried sealing but with little success. In February, with the season drawing short, Weddell made the decision to head North toward South Georgia. After spending a month there, the two ships sailed to the Falkland Islands to spend the winter. Whilst the Jane was prepared for winter gales, the Beaufoy was used to scout for fur seals. In October, the decision was made to sail south again to the South Orkney Islands but found the conditions were terrible with both vessels damaged by ice and the men frostbitten. Both set sail North for Tierra del Fuego and continued sealing along the Patagonian coast. The ships then split up, with Brisbane sailing for the Falkland Islands and South Georgia in January. The two intended to rendezvous in March off the coast of Patagonia but, having missed each other, sailed back to London. Brisbane in the Beaufoy arrived there on 20 June 1824, some two weeks before Weddell.

On 23 August 1824, Brisbane set sail in the Beaufoy for another sealing voyage along the Patagonian coast and the Falkland Islands. On 15 January 1826, the Beaufoy set sail to return to England arriving on 29 March 1826.

== Shipwrecks ==
On 16 June 1826, Brisbane became the master of the 103 ton schooner Prince of Saxe-Coburg outfitted for sealing in the South Orkney Islands. This voyage proved to be disastrous: first meeting atrocious weather and then pack ice that damaged the ship, Brisbane made the decision to run for Tierra del Fuego in order to make repairs. There on 16 December 1826, whilst anchored in Fury Bay on the southern end of the Cockburn Channel the schooner was driven ashore by violent williwaws. Brisbane survived with his entire crew, managing to salvage three of the schooner's boats and provisions. A camp was set up on shore and then Brisbane set about organising a rescue, whilst simultaneously dealing with an increasingly mutinous crew. Seven of the crew volunteered to take the largest boat to make for Rio Negro over 1000 miles away (they succeeded and immediately volunteered to serve in the Argentine navy in the conflict with Brazil). Meanwhile, Brisbane continued to organise the survivors sending out patrols in the remaining two boats and setting the crew to work constructing a vessel from the wreck of the Prince of Saxe-Coburg. On 3 March 1827, one of the boats was spotted by HMS Beagle who rescued the survivors.

Brisbane returned to London in 1827, finding another command the 143 ton schooner Hope and left once more for the South Atlantic on 17 January 1828. In April 1829, the Hope was wrecked off the coast of South Georgia. Brisbane and the crew constructed a shallop from the wreckage and sailed for Montevideo. On 9 April he made landfall in Rio Negro, then sailed North in the smack Triunfo arriving in Buenos Aires on 2 May. Ten of his crew remained at South Georgia, so Brisbane set about organising a rescue. In Buenos Aires, he met Luis Vernet from whom he chartered the American Brig Betsy to rescue the remaining crew members.

Brisbane's third and final shipwreck was aboard the sealer Bellville under the command of Captain Bray. This wrecked on the east coast of Tierra del Fuego. Again the crew constructed a shallop from the wreckage but were hampered in the task by the local Fuegians who constantly pilfered tools and supplies. Supplies were exhausted in early April and the crew nearly starved surviving on a diet of hides, putrid blubber, berries, limpets and fish. The shallop was finished on 1 May and the voyage in a very leaky boat began. Cape Meredith on West Falkland was sighted four days later and the crew arrived in Port Louis on 30 May.

== Falkland Islands ==
At Port Louis, Brisbane once again met the entrepreneur Luis Vernet and became his director of fisheries. In 1830, he visited Buenos Aires and gave notice in the British Packet and Argentine News of Vernet's fishing claims and warnings to sealers. The British consul in Buenos Aires, Woodbine Parish, warned Brisbane not to interfere with British commerce in the islands. In July 1831, Brisbane and Vernet seized the American vessels Superior, Breakwater and Harriet. The Breakwater escaped and the Superior was allowed to continue sealing on Vernet's terms. Vernet returned in the Harriet to Buenos Aires to arrange for a trial.

The seizure of the American ships proved to be a disastrous move for the small settlement at Port Louis. The USS Lexington had been sent to reinforce the Brazil Squadron to protect American commerce, in part a response to Argentine proclamations on sealing and fishing in the South Atlantic. Under the command of Silas M. Duncan the Lexington sailed for Port Louis to put an end to what was regarded by the US as a "nest of pirates". On 31 December 1831, the Lexington came to anchor off Port Louis, Brisbane and six others were arrested on charges of piracy, the guns of the settlement spiked and the powder magazine blown. Duncan also offered passage to any from the settlement who wished to leave, and the majority of the population took up this opportunity to leave the islands. The Lexington arrived in Montevideo on 3 February 1832, where those given passage were released, but Brisbane and six others remained as prisoners until 16 April, when they were transferred to the USS Warren. Brisbane and the others were later released on the orders of Commodore Rodgers.

Brisbane soon returned to the Falkland Islands acting as pilot for Major Pinedo commander of the ARA Sarandi, which transported Major Esteban Mestivier to the islands to take up his post as governor and to establish a penal colony. Shortly after the Sarandi left to survey the islands Mestivier was murdered, leaving the settlement in uproar. Pinedo returned and had put down the mutiny with the assistance of the British schooner Rapid when on 3 January HMS Clio appeared off Port Louis and delivered the message that the UK intended to re-assert sovereignty over the islands. Brisbane returned to Buenos Aires in the Sarandi where he resigned as pilot.

Brisbane returned to the Falklands in March 1833 aboard the schooner Rapid, at the time of the first visit by HMS Beagle under the command of Captain Fitzroy and with Charles Darwin on board as naturalist. Brisbane was reunited with one of the officer who had saved his life when he was wrecked in the Prince of Saxe-Coburg. Brisbane visited the Beagle presenting his papers to Captain Fitzroy showing that he was acting as Vernet's private agent and was there to look after the remains of Vernet's private property. Brisbane and Fitzroy had a natural affinity and discussed a broad range of subjects; Fitzroy notes his diary his gratitude for a great deal of information about the Falklands. However, on leaving Fitzroy expressed his concern for the settlement with its lack of regular authority in a virtually lawless group of islands.

Brisbane resumed his position as Vernet's agent and with other senior members of the settlement tried to rebuild Vernet's business interests. He recommenced paying the Gauchos in promissory notes issued by Vernet, which led to conflict within the settlement. The Gauchos resented the reimposition of authority and wanted to be paid in silver as Captain Onslow of the Clio had done. The situation was exacerbated by the devaluation of the promissory notes as a result of Vernet's reduced status.

== Death ==
On 26 August 1833, five Indian convicts and three gauchos led by Antonio Rivero embarked on a killing spree which resulted in the deaths of Brisbane and the senior leaders of the settlement. Thomas Helsby, a clerk in the employ of Vernet, wrote an account of the murders.

At around ten in the morning, Helsby departed Brisbane's house to buy some oil from William Dickson, whom he found at the house of Antonio Wagner. Other people there included Daniel McKay and Joseph Douglas. On leaving, as he passed the house of Santiago Lopez, Helsby encountered the murderers. The gang was led by Rivero and comprised José María Luna, Juan Brasido, Manuel Gonzales, Luciano Flores, Manuel Godoy, Felipe Salagar and Lattorre. They were armed with "muskets, pistols, swords, dirks and knives".

Alarmed, Helsby ran to Brisbane's house for aid, but he found it locked and could raise no response. He was informed by other residents that Brisbane had been killed, along with Juan Simon (the Capitaz of the Gauchos). A third man, Don Ventura, had been left for dead, wounded in the throat by a musket, his head split and his hand almost severed by a sword, but he had since escaped by a back window and headed toward the house of Antonina Roxa. Helsby then heard two musket shots from the house of Antonio Wagner: Wagner and Dickson had been killed, witnessed by Joseph Douglas and Daniel McKay.

The gang then returned to Brisbane's house to find Ventura missing. After a brief search they found him. Ventura tried to flee but was shot down. Helsby witnessed the murder and attempted his own escape but was soon caught by Felipe Salagar, who was on horseback. Convinced he was about to be killed he complied with their instructions, and was allowed to live.

I was ordered by them into Captain Brisbane's house, and there first saw his body lying dead upon the floor, he appeared to have been making towards his pistols before he fell, and there was smile of contempt or disdain very strongly marked in his countenance. They dragged his body with a horse to a considerable distance, and plundered the house.

Brisbane was buried in a shallow grave. Visiting the Falklands a year later on the Beagle's second visit to the islands, Captain Fitzroy was appalled to find that Brisbane's feet were protruding from the ground, and that dogs had fed on the corpse.

This was the fate of an honest, industrious, and most faithful man: of a man who feared no danger, and despised hardships. He was murdered by villains, because he defended the property of his friend; he was mangled by them to satisfy their hellish spite; dragged by a lasso, at a horse's heels, away from the houses, and left to be eaten by dogs.

== Memorials ==
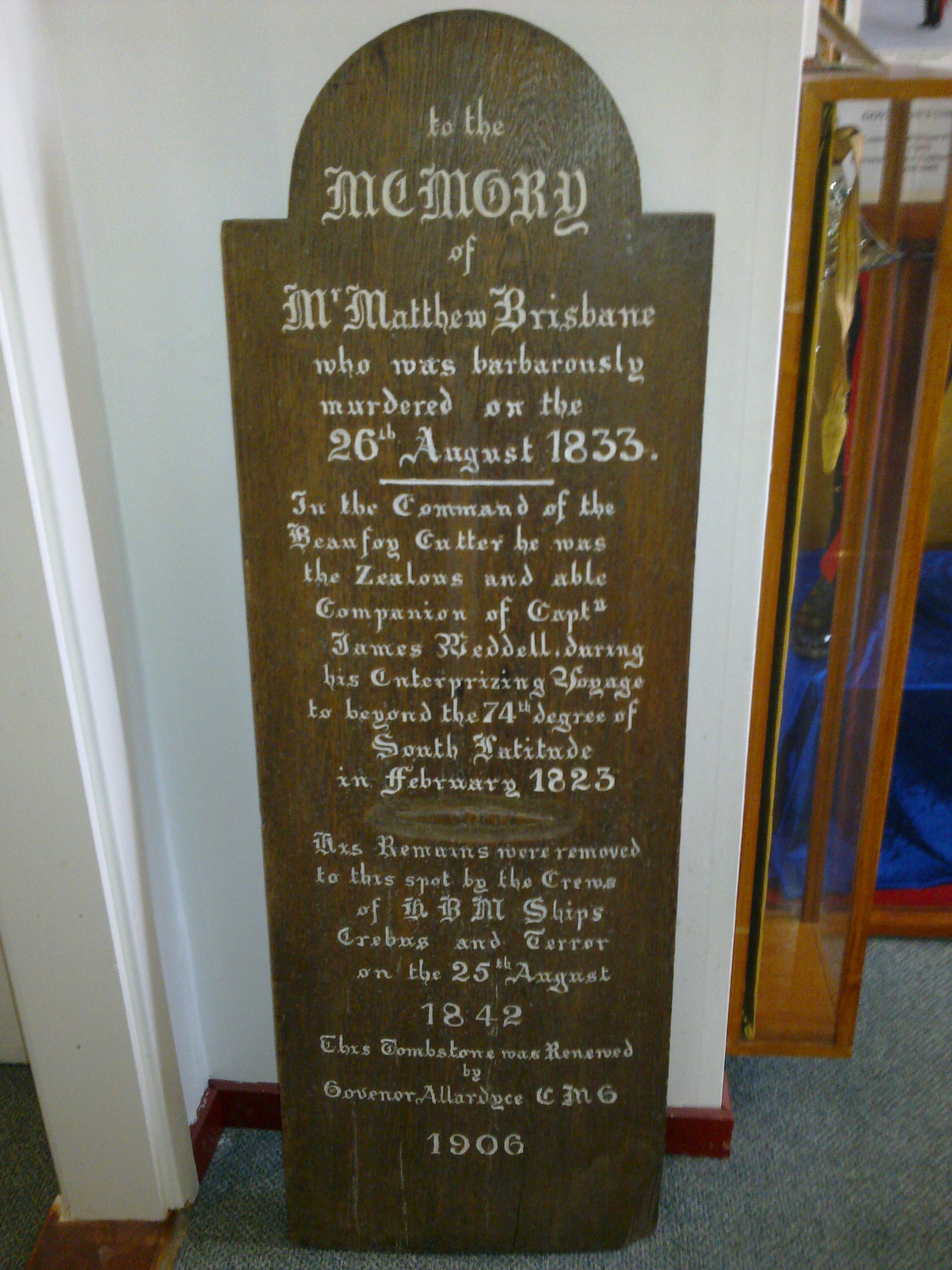
The wooden marker replaced in 1906 is now in the Falkland Islands Museum

Brisbane was reburied in 1842 by James Clark Ross, then in the Falklands with the Erebus and Terror. A simple wooden memorial was erected inscribed with:

To the
MEMORY
of
M^{r} Matthew Brisbane
who was barbarously
murdered on the
26^{th} August 1833
——————
In the command of the
Beaufoy Cutter he was
the Zealous and able
Companion of Capt^{n}
James Weddell during
his enterprising Voyage
to beyond the 74^{th} degree of
South Latitude
in February 1823
——————
His remains were removed to
this spot by the crews of H.B.M.
ships "Erebus" and "Terror"
on the 25^{th} August
1842

The wooden marker remained until 1906 by which time it had become illegible through weathering, it was replaced with another marked with the same inscription. In 1933, it was replaced with a marble slab laid by Governor O'Grady. The replacement wooden marker is now in Stanley museum.

There is a Brisbane Road in Stanley. Brisbane is also memorialised by Cape Brisbane and Mount Beaufoy on Henderson Island in Tierra del Fuego and by Brisbane Heights on Coronation Island in the South Orkney Islands.
