= Esteban Mestivier =

Argentine soldier

Major José Francisco Esteban Mestivier
- Joseph François Etienne Mestivier
- Died: 1832; Puerto Luis
- Cause of death: Murdered
- Resting place: Unknown
- Occupation: Soldier
- Known for: Argentine Military and Civil commander who was murdered in a mutiny
- Spouse: Gertrudis Sanchez
- Children: 1

Esteban Mestivier (died 1832) served as the Argentine Military and Civil commander in the Falkland Islands for a brief period in 1832. His appointment to the role was gazetted in the British and Argentine Packet News in September 1832. The announcement led to the British consul issuing a note of protest, which other than a brief acknowledgement from Argentina went unanswered. This combined with the USS Lexington raid of 1831, is considered to have prompted the British to send a small naval patrol to re-assert British sovereignty in the Falkland Islands.

Arriving in October 1832, he was murdered in a mutiny the following month. There are few reliably known details of his early life and even the exact circumstances of his death are unclear.

== Early life ==
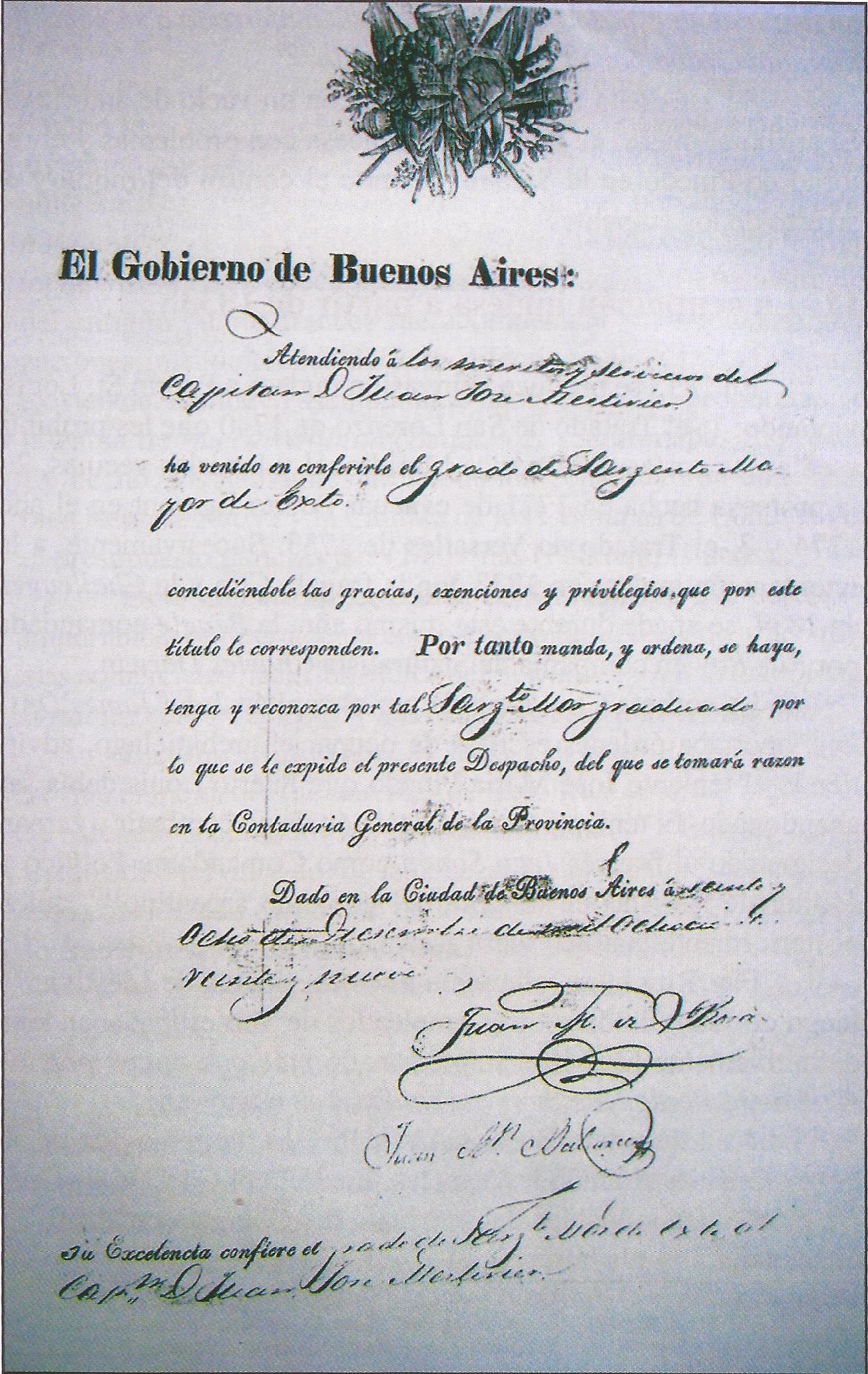
Document naming Esteban Mestivier with the rank of brevet major by Juan Manuel de Rosas in 1829.

There is very little known for certain about Mestivier's life. He was French-born but even his name is not known with certainty. The Argentine historian Paul Groussac (also of French origin) refers to him as Jean or Juan, but reflecting a custom of hispanicising Christian names he is generally referred to as Major Esteban Mestivier in Argentine literature.

There are records of Mestivier serving in the campaigns against the aboriginal people in the region around Bahia Blanca. This was at the time the southern boundary of the United Provinces of South America one of the precursor states of what is now Argentina. In the 7th Cavalry he served as a First Lieutenant, was promoted to captain in 1828 and to brevet major in 1829.

== Deployment to the Falklands ==
Following the USS Lexington raid of 1831, Luis Vernet refused to continue as military and civil commander in the Falkland Islands. President Juan Rosas conferred upon Mestivier the appointment of interim military and civil commander on 10 September 1832. This was subsequently confirmed by being gazetted in the British and Argentine Packet News on 15 September 1832. The announcement provoked a protest from the British minister in Buenos Aires, Henry Fox, on 28 September 1832, which like the protests of 1829 against Vernet's appointment, went unanswered apart from a brief acknowledgement. This, combined with the Lexington raid of 1831 prompted the British to send a naval patrol to re-assert sovereignty over the Falkland Islands.

On 23 September 1832, Mestivier departed on board the ARA Sarandi commanded by Major Pinedo, accompanied by his pregnant wife and a garrison of 25 men together with their wives and children. This small garrison included criminals released from prison to serve in the army. Some of Vernet's men also took passage including William Dickson and Henry Metcalfe, Vernet's deputy Matthew Brisbane acted in the capacity of pilot for the Sarandi.

On 10 October 1832, Mestivier performed a ceremony formally claiming the islands for the United Provinces.

== Death ==
Mestivier was a harsh disciplinarian, which resulted in a mutiny against his authority. The exact circumstances of Mestivier's death are not certain. What is known is that on 21 November 1832, the Sarandi departed on patrol and on 30 November 1832 Mestivier was shot and then bayoneted to death by four of the mutineers. The historian Antonio Lastra indicates a couple who ran the bar were also murdered. The mutineers then stole horses and fled. Mestivier was buried immediately but his grave was not marked.

== Aftermath ==
Adjutant Juan Antonio Gomila, Mestivier's second-in-command, moved into the house and announced he proposed to share a bedroom with Mestivier's widow. It was later learned that Gomila was implicated in the mutiny. The crews of the British sealer Rapid and the French whaler Jean Jacques witnessed the mutiny and took action. Mestivier's widow was taken on board the Rapid. Gauchos from Vernet's settlers together with armed men from the Jean Jacques captured the mutineers near what is now known as Estancia and imprisoned them on board the Rapid.

The Sarandi returned a month later and its commander Jose Pinedo took control. His investigation was interrupted on 2 January 1833 by the arrival of HMS Clio under the command of Captain Onslow. Onslow had been sent to assert British sovereignty over the islands and requested that the Sarandi and garrison leave the islands. The Sarandi and the Rapid departed on 5 January 1833 taking the mutineers to Buenos Aires.

On return to Buenos Aires, the mutineers were put on trial. Seven were convicted of mutiny and condemned to death, and two others received jail sentences and a flogging. On 8 February 1833, those sentenced to death were executed by firing squad and their bodies gibbeted on the gallows for four hours. The two sentenced to prison escaped the more severe punishment by extending their service in the army. The clemency shown to Adjutant Gomila (who was exiled) was bitterly criticised by Mestivier's widow.
