= José María Pinedo =

Argentine naval officer (1795–1885)

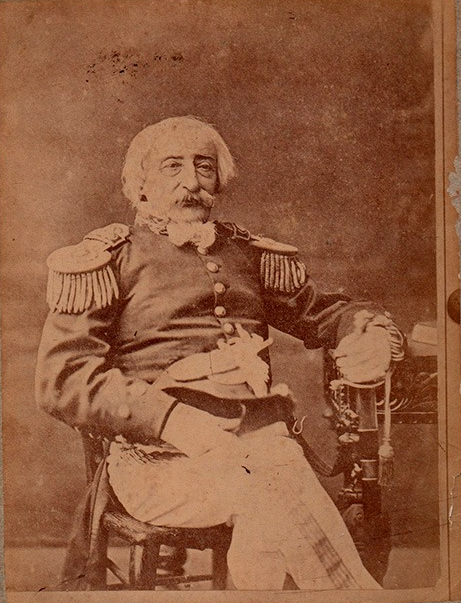
- Pinedo in 1885
- Born: 21 June 1795; Buenos Aires, Viceroyalty of the Río de la Plata
- Died: 19 February 1885 (aged 89); Buenos Aires, Argentina
- Burial place: Buenos Aires, Argentina
- Spouse(s): Wilhelmina y Igarzábal; Dolores y Igarzábal
- Military career
- Allegiance: Argentine Confederation
- Branch: Argentine Navy
- Rank: Colonel
- Conflicts: Argentine War of Independence; Argentine Civil Wars; Cisplatine War; Re-establishment of British rule on the Falklands (1833)

Signature
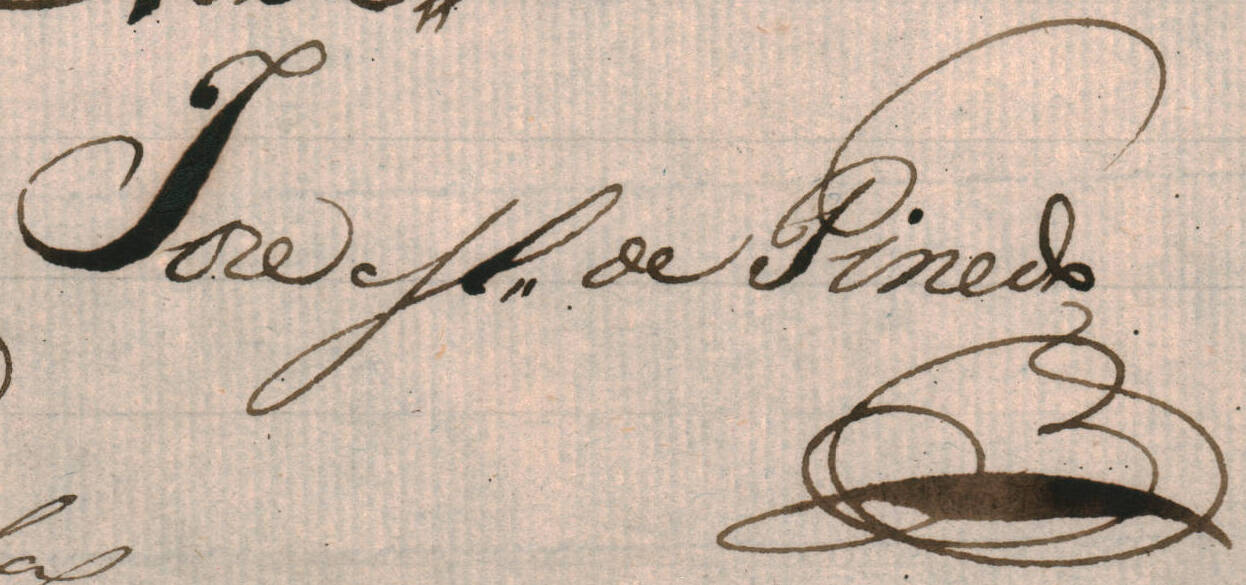

José María Pinedo (21 June 1795 – 19 February 1885) was a commander in the navy of the United Provinces of the River Plate, one of the precursor states of what is now known as Argentina. He took part in the Argentine War of Independence, the Argentine Civil Wars and the Cisplatine War. Although his most remembered performance is the passive role he played during the occupation of the Malvinas Islands by the United Kingdom.

== Early life ==
José María Pinedo was born on 21 July 1795 in Buenos Aires, then part of the Viceroyalty of the Río de la Plata of the Spanish Empire. His father, José Agustín de Pinedo, was a colonel in the Spanish army; his mother was Juana Albizuri y Echaurri.

== War of Independence ==
On 1 April 1816, Pinedo began his naval career as an unranked officer in the crew of the corvette Vigilancia, under the command of Major Jorge Ross. Between 1818 and 1819, the Vigilancia acted as a Privateer in European waters. In Philadelphia he transshipped to the armed schooner Independencia a privateer organised by Juan Pedro Aguirre under the command of Lieutenant Colonel Juan Grimalds. Pinedo was wounded twice in actions, against Spanish shipping in the North Atlantic.

== Argentine civil wars ==
On 14 September 1819, Pinedo was given command of the schooner Fortuna After leaving the Paraná River he joined the naval forces under the command of Ángel Hubac fighting the forces of Caudillos Francisco Ramírez and Estanislao López. On 26 December 1819, Fortuna took part in the Battle of Boca del Colastiné where Hubac was mortally wounded and replaced by Captain Manuel Monteverde. Three days later on 29 December, Fortuna took part in the Battle of Punta Gorda.

In March 1820, Monteverde's squadron under the auspices of the Treaty of Pilar came under the command of Francisco Ramírez and joined the forces fighting against those of Caudillo José Gervasio Artigas. On 17 April, Monteverde defected but Pinedo and other officer under his command remained loyal to Buenos Aires.

On 6 November 1820, he was promoted to acting 1st Lieutenant and after the campaign he was transferred to the port of Buenos Aires as a staff officer, where he established the headquarters of the navy's Service of Hygiene.

== Cisplatine War ==
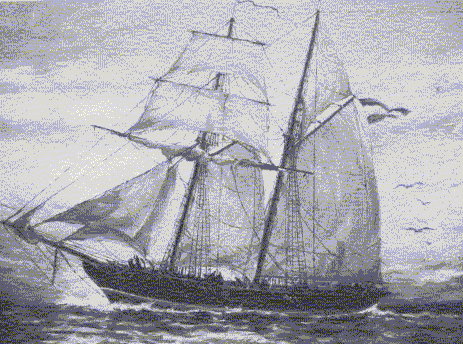
ARA Sarandí

On 4 December 1825, on the outbreak of the Cisplatine War, Pinedo was appointed full 1st Lieutenant and given the command of the schooner ARA Sarandí in the squadron commanded by Admiral William Brown. Sarandí took part in the unsuccessful attacks on the fortress of the Colonia del Sacramento in February and March 1826. Despite heavy losses, Brown continued with an offensive strategy and decided to attempt the capture of the frigate Nichteroy, the flagship of Admiral James Norton (a former Royal Navy officer in the service of the Imperial Brazilian Navy). Learning that the Nichteroy was in the harbour of Montevideo, Brown assembled a squadron that included the Sarandí and attempted to infiltrate the harbour on April 10. The attack was compromised by an encounter with a Brazilian launch and Brown fled pursued by the Brazilian squadron. After a ruse to separate the Brazilian squadron by scattering and then regrouping failed, Brown engaged the Brazilian squadron damaging the Nichteroy until he could escape under the cloak of darkness. Brown did not give up and resolved to try again on April 27 but by mistake the Frigate Emperatriz was attacked. Brown ordered the Sarandí to move on the Nichteroy before she could reach Montevideo, but Pinedo disobeyed his orders.

As part of Brown's continued aggressive campaign, on May 2, Pinedo participated in the Battle of Ortiz Bank and in the same month exchanged fire with the Maceió and on May 23 his ship was hit flush with the waterline. Pinedo participated in the convoy which resulted in the battle of Los Pozos on 11 June 1826. After Pinedo failed to engage until late in the action at the Battle of Quilmes on 29–30 July 1826 Brown relieved Pinedo of command. He was the given command of the Sin Par and cruised the coast of Brazil capturing 30 vessels, 7 of which were transferred to Buenos Aires. On 4 August 1827 he was promoted to captain, taking command of the privateer Rápido and went on to capture two more Brazilian ships. Eventually he was taken prisoner and taken to Rio de Janeiro and released after the peace of 1828, returning to Argentine in the brigantine Riobamba.

== The Falkland Islands ==
On 27 October 1829, Pinedo was promoted to Major and appointed once more as commander of the Sarandí. The Sarandí was mainly employed in the area of Carmen de Patagones and Bahía Blanca. In 1831, the Sarandí under Pinedo was part of the squadron under the command of Jonas Halstead Coe (Spanish: Comodoro Juan Coe).

Following the USS Lexington raid of 1831, Luis Vernet refused to continue as military and civil commander in the Falklands Islands. Governor Juan Rosas conferred upon Major Esteban Mestivier the appointment of interim military and civil commander on 10 September 1832. The announcement provoked a protest from the British minister in Buenos Aires, Henry Fox, on 28 September 1832, which like the protests of 1829 against Vernet's appointment, went unanswered apart from a brief acknowledgement. This, combined with the Lexington raid of 1831 spurred the British to send a naval patrol to re-assert sovereignty over the Falkland Islands.

ARA Sarandí was tasked with taking Mestivier along with a garrison of twenty five men together with their wives and children. This small garrison included criminals sentenced to serve in the army. (Note: In the United Provinces at this time, criminals could be sentenced to serve in the army rather than prison. One of these, Sergeant Valiente, had recently been implicated in the murder of the Military and Civil Commander of the Argentine Presidio on the island of Martín García) On 23 September 1832, the ARA Sarandí left for the Falkland Islands. Some of Vernet's men also took passage including William Dickson and Henry Metcalfe, Vernet's deputy Matthew Brisbane acted in the capacity of pilot for the Sarandí.

On 10 October 1832, Mestivier performed a ceremony formally claiming the islands for the United Provinces.

On 21 November 1832, Sarandí departed on patrol around the Falkland Islands, where she encountered the American sealer The Sun under the command of T.P.Trott on 7 December 1832. After firing on The Sun and boarding her, the captain was ordered to quit the Falklands. Trott returned to Montevideo and addressed the American legation there seeking protection from an American warship. In Montevideo, Trott was instructed to return to the islands and to ignore the warning, whilst the USS Lexington was prepared to return to the islands and if necessary seize the Sarandí.

Mestivier was a harsh disciplinarian, which resulted in a mutiny against his authority whilst the Sarandí was absent on patrol. The exact circumstances of Mestivier's death are not certain. What is known is that on 21 November 1832, the Sarandí departed on patrol and on 30 November 1832 Mestivier was shot and then bayoneted to death by four of the mutineers. The mutiny was suppressed by armed sailors from the French whaler Jean Jacques, whilst Mestivier's widow was taken on board the Rapid (a British sealer). The Sarandí returned on 30 December 1832 and Pinedo took control.

Pinedo's investigation of the mutiny was interrupted on 2 January 1833 by the arrival of HMS Clio under the command of Captain Onslow. Onslow had been sent to reassert British sovereignty over the islands and sent a note requesting that the Sarandí and garrison leave the islands.

His Majesty's sloop Clio, Berkeley Sound, 2d January, 1833.

Sir, I have to acquaint you, I have received directions from his Excellency the Commander-in-chief of his Britannic Majesty's ships and vessels of war on the South American station, in the name of his Britannic Majesty, to execute the 'rights of sovereignty over these islands.'

It is my intention to hoist to-morrow morning, the national flag of Great Britain on shore, when I request you will be pleased to haul down your flag on shore, and withdraw your forces, taking with you all stores, etc, belonging to your Government.

I am, Sir, your most obedient humble servant,

J. J. Onslow, Commander.

His Excellency the commander of the Buenos Ayrean forces at Port Luiz, Berkeley Sound.

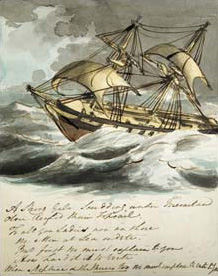
Sketch of a brig-sloop, probably HMS "Clio", by Cmdr. William Farrington, ca. 1812, Peabody Essex Museum

The Argentine historian Laurio H. Destéfani indicates that Pinedo did in fact make preparations to resist. His ship, the ARA Sarandí mounted 8 guns (8 × 8-pounder) (Note: There are several references to the armament carried by the Sarandí in different periods and it is apparent that her configuration varied in service. Other sources indicate that in service with William Brown in the Cisplatine War she mounted 9 guns (1 × 16-pounder, 2 × 12-pounder, 2 × 8-pounder and 4 × Gónadas). Even with a heavier armament the Sarandí was at a disadvantage compared with the Clio. Destéfani indicates that the Sarandí also carried a type of cannon known as a Pedrero, this is a small short barrelled cannon intended to fire stone balls.) compared with the eighteen guns (16 × 32-pounder carronades, 2 × 6-pounder bow guns) of the Brig-Sloop HMS Clio. He had twenty five soldiers at his disposal, although nine men had been implicated in the mutiny as had the adjutant, captain Juan Antonio Gomila (Mestivier's second-in-command). This compared with the complement of twenty Royal Marines aboard the Clio. One concern was that a large number of his crew were British mercenaries, which was not unusual in the newly independent states in Latin America, where land forces were strong, but navies were frequently quite undermanned. Despite this Destefani reports that Pinedo released Gomila instructing him to arm and prepare the men, with Gomila arming the garrison. Pinedo also prepared the ship and spoke to the crew who indicated their willingness to fight but Pinedo lost his nerve and decided to offer no resistance.

Pinedo's list of passengers returning aboard the Sarandí

Pinedo protested verbally and refused to lower the Argentine flag. The British forces disembarked on 3 January and switched the flags, delivering the Argentine one to Pinedo. The British schooner Rapid (Note: The sealer Rapid had been chartered by Adjutant Gomila to break its sealing voyage and transport the prisoners to the mainland for the agreed sum of £1000. The full sum was never paid and subsequently the Rapid was chartered by Luis Vernet to return to the islands in 1833 transporting his officers including Matthew Brisbane.) departed on 5 January 1833 taking the mutineers to Buenos Aires. There is some confusion over the date of the sailing of the Sarandí, official protests indicate that the Sarandí sailed on 5 January and modern accounts repeat this. However, the trial transcript from Pinedo's court martial indicate that the Sarandí sailed a day earlier. Argentina now claims that Vernet's colony was also expelled at this time, though many historians contradict this, stating that the colonists were encouraged to remain initially under the authority of Vernet's storekeeper, William Dickson and later his deputy, Matthew Brisbane.

On returning to the River Plate, the Sarandí was observed by the Americans as the USS Lexington was being prepared to sail to the Falklands to protect American interests. As a result, there was no further action by the Americans.

On his return Pinedo was the subject of a Court-martial for failing to resist the British in accordance with the Argentine Military Code. He argued that he did not receive specific instructions from Buenos Aires on how to react in case of a British military expedition. He was found guilty with a split decision between execution and being expelled from the service being decided by the Judge Advocate in favour of expulsion. However, the verdict was annulled due to irregularities in the proceedings and Pinedo given another command four months later.

== War against Uruguay ==
Pinedo was promoted to lieutenant colonel on 3 July 1833. He commanded the Brig General Rosas between April and June 1834 patrolling the River Plate before transferring to the Schooner San Martin until September, when he joined the squadron of colonel Tomas Espora, which patrolled the Paraná river against any attempts of infiltration by the Paraguayan fleet, after threats made by Paraguayan dictator Gaspar Rodríguez de Francia. In 1835, he commanded the schooner Federación patrolling between Bahía Blanca and Patagonia.

On 29 September 1838 he was appointed colonel. Between January and May of that year he commanded the brig Republicano(the former schooner General San Martín).

During the French blockade of the Río de la Plata Pinedo, once more under the command of William Brown, engaged several French launches. On 25 February 1841 Pinedo relieved John King of command of the Brig Vigilante then part of a squadron fighting against the squadron of Fructuoso Rivera.

Between July and December 1841 Pinedo commanded the schooner Libertad conducting patrols in the River Plate. In January 1842, he became commander of the schooner Restaurador and the General Echagüe (formerly the Cagancha and later renamed Republicano). With this small flotilla Pinedo once more under the command of William Brown). Pinedo participated in riverine action against the forces of the Italian revolutionary Giuseppe Garibaldi, whose squadron was eventually destroyed at the battle of Costa Brava. Later in 1842 he organised a squadron under Republicano to operate in the Uruguay River to protect the province of Entre Rios.

== Later years ==
In 1844, he was the military commander of Paysandú. He was accused of abusing his authority and admonished by General Antonio F. Díaz, Minister of War under Manuel Oribe. Pinedo openly rebelled and was removed from office, a decision ratified by Justo José de Urquiza. The dictator Juan Manuel de Rosas ordered that he was relieved of his command and placed under arrest despite the influence of his brother General Agustín de Pinedo.

Pinedo later served again in the Argentine Navy, being tasked to organise a squadron by Rosas as part of a naval academy, he hoisted his flag in the schooner Julio in 1850. Pinedo instructed midshipmen until the academy was dissolved in 1851. After the Battle of Caseros in February 1852, Pinedo was discharged from the Navy, but this decision was reconsidered on 17 July 1852.

Pinedo joined the blockading squadron of the Argentine Confederation based in Buenos Aires, commanding a Brig but on 20 June 1854 he defected along with his vessel into the fleet of the state of Buenos Aires led by José Murature. The following day Commodore John Halstead Coe followed suit, both receiving an award of two million pesos in ounces of gold, to be distributed among the officers.

In 1864, he became an inspector in the corps of invalids.

He died in Buenos Aires on 19 February 1885.

He originally married Wilhelmina y Igarzábal and later married her sister, Dolores y Igarzábal.
