= John James Onslow =

Royal Navy officer (1785–1856)

Captain John James Onslow
- Born: 1785
- Died: 1856 (aged 70–71)
- Relatives: Sir Richard Onslow (father)
- Military career
- Allegiance: Great Britain; United Kingdom
- Branch: Royal Navy
- Service years: c.1810–1847
- Rank: Captain
- Commands: Surveillante; HMS Montagu; HMS Conqueror; HMS Clio; HMS Daphne
- Conflicts: Peninsular War; War of 1812; Reassertion of British sovereignty over the Falkland Islands

Captain John James Onslow (1785–1856) was a Royal Navy officer who commanded HMS Clio during the reassertion of British sovereignty over the Falkland Islands. Onslow successfully brought the islands under British control. Onslow was the son of Sir Richard Onslow, 1st Baronet and second cousin of Thomas Onslow, 2nd Earl of Onslow.
