= Invasion of the Falkland Islands =

Invasion of the Falkland Islands may refer to:

- Reassertion of British sovereignty over the Falkland Islands (1833), which is regarded in Argentina as an invasion
- Aerolíneas Argentinas Flight 648 hijacking, a 1966 attempt by Argentinian nationalists to seize the islands
- 1982 invasion of the Falkland Islands
