= William Dickson (Falklands settler) =

Irish-born Falkland Islands settler (died 1833)

- Born: c. 1805; Dublin
- Died: 26 August 1833; Port Louis, Falkland Islands
- Cause of death: Murdered
- Resting place: Port Louis
- Occupations: Storekeeper, Gaucho
- Known for: early Falklands History, entrusted to fly British flag, his diary, role in the Gaucho murders

William Dickson, born Dublin, Ireland (died 26 August 1833) was an Irish-born settler in Port Louis in the Falkland Islands during a pivotal time in its history. He was hired by Luis Vernet as Port Louis storekeeper. Following the removal of the Argentine administration, Dickson was given into custody the British flag. Dickson wrote a diary where he documented the life in Port Louis shortly after the British landing. He became one of the victims of the Gaucho Murders, on 26 August 1833.

== Vernet's storekeeper ==
Dickson was appointed storekeeper by Vernet at Port Louis. Dickson's customers were mostly gauchos working around the settlement. They bought him commodities in notes issued by Vernet's itself, which were legally valueless.

== Custody of British flag and log ==
On 2 January 1833, Captain Onslow, of the brig-sloop HMS Clio, arrived at Louis Vernet's settlement at Port Louis to request that the flag of the United Provinces of the River Plate be replaced with the British one, and for the administration to leave the islands. While Major José María Pinedo, commander of the schooner Sarandí, wanted to resist, his numerical disadvantage was obvious (See here for a comparison of the forces), particularly as a large number of his crew were British mercenaries who were unwilling to fight their own countrymen. Such a situation was not unusual in the newly independent states in Latin America, where land forces were strong, but navies were frequently quite undermanned. As such he protested verbally, but departed without a fight on 5 January.

Initial British plans for the Islands were based upon the continuation of Vernet's settlement at Port Louis. William Dickson was requested to fly the British flag on Sundays and whenever ships were in harbour. Dickson attempted to send a letter to Vernet, then in Buenos Aires, reporting to him the news about the British landing and the situation in Port Louis, but Clio departed before Dickson could entrust the missive to Onslow.

Dickson wrote a diary from 3 March to 26 August 1833, where he describes the day-after-day life in the settlement. Dickson depicts its inhabitants as unruly and troublesome, amid a hostile environment. Dickson log is the only documented narrative of the events that preceded the Gaucho Murders.

== Gaucho murders ==
On 26 August 1833, armed with weapons provided by American sealers, a gang of gauchos and Indians led by Antonio Rivero ran amok in Port Louis. The gang killed five settlers including William Dickson. The survivors (13 men, 3 women and 2 children) took refuge on Turf Island in Berkley Sound until they were rescued by the British sealer Hopeful in October 1833.

== See also ==
- Louis Vernet
- Origins of Falkland Islanders
- Puerto Soledad
- Reassertion of British sovereignty over the Falkland Islands (1833)
- List of governors of the Falkland Islands

== Bibliography ==
- Laurio Hedelvio Destéfani (1982). The Malvinas, the South Georgias, and the South Sandwich Islands, the conflict with Britain. Edipress. ISBN 978-950-01-6904-2.
