= Changes in British sovereignty =

A list of former and present British colonies, dependencies and dates when they severed legal ties with Britain:

== Losses ==
- New Zealand (1986) – severed legal ties (see: Constitution Act 1986) with Britain, but (see: Monarchy of New Zealand) retained Elizabeth II as head of state.
- Fiji (1987) – post-coup end of dominion status accepted on 15 October. Elizabeth II remained traditional (though unofficial) Paramount Chief until 2012, when the informal links with the British monarchy have been terminated.
- New Zealand (2003) – court of final appeal transferred from the Judicial Committee of the Privy Council to the Supreme Court of New Zealand, which was created in 2004.

=== Losses in sovereignty or other jurisdiction ===
- The Thirteen Colonies declared independence from Great Britain on 4 July 1776.
- Egypt (1922) – see Unilateral Declaration of Egyptian Independence.
- Australia, Canada, the Irish Free State, New Zealand, Dominion of Newfoundland, and Union of South Africa (1926) – Dominions at the time of the Balfour Declaration of 1926.
- Weihai (1930) – fully restored to (Taiwan) Republic of China sovereignty on 1 October.
- Australia, Canada, the Irish Free State, New Zealand, Dominion of Newfoundland, and Union of South Africa (1931) – Recognized Dominions as "autonomous communities within the British Empire" as per the Statute of Westminster. The Statue also affirmed the British Parliament wouldn't legislate for the Dominions unless explicitly requested.
- British Raj (1947) – partitioned on 15 August into the independent dominions of India and Pakistan.
- Burma and Dominion of Ceylon (1948) – independence to Burma as a republic granted on 4 January; to Ceylon on 4 February.
- Dominion of Newfoundland (1949) – incorporated into Canada as a province on 31 March.
- Sudan (1956) – independence granted on 1 January (was a condominium with Egypt)
- Ghana (as Gold Coast) (1957) – independence granted on 6 March.
- States of Malacca and Penang (1957) – joined Malaya on 31 August.
- British Somaliland (1960) – became part of a unified Somalia on 1 July.
- Cyprus and the Federation of Nigeria (1960) – independence granted to Cyprus as a republic on 16 August (but retaining the Sovereign Base Areas of Akrotiri and Dhekelia); to Nigeria on 1 October.
- Sierra Leone and Tanganyika (1961) – independence granted to Sierra Leone on 27 April; to Tanganyika on 9 December.
- British Cameroon (1961) – southern part incorporated into Cameroon on 1 October and northern part incorporated into Nigeria on 31 may.
- Jamaica, Trinidad and Tobago and Uganda (1962) – independence granted to Jamaica on 6 August; to Trinidad and Tobago on 31 August; and to Uganda on 9 October.
- States of Sabah (as North Borneo), Sarawak, and Singapore (1963) – states formed Malaysia with the Federation of Malaya on 16 September
- Nigeria and Kenya independence granted to Nigeria as federal republic on 1 October; Kenya on 12 December.
- Malawi (as Nyasaland), Malta, and Zambia (1964) – independence granted to Malawi on 6 July; Malta on 21 September; Zambia as a republic on 24 October.
- The Gambia (1965) – independence granted on 18 February.
- Guyana (as British Guiana), Botswana (as Bechuanaland Protectorate), Lesotho (as Basutoland), and Barbados (1966) – independence granted to Guyana on 26 May; Botswana on 30 September; Lesotho on 4 October; Barbados on 30 November.
- State of Aden (1967) – joined South Yemen on 30 November.
- Mauritius and Swaziland (1968) – independence granted to Mauritius on 12 March; to Swaziland on 6 September.
- Fiji (1970) – independence granted on 10 October.
- The Bahamas (1973) – independence granted on 10 July.
- Seychelles, Solomon Islands, Tuvalu, and Dominica (1978) – independence granted to Seychelles on 29 June; to Solomon Islands on 7 July; to Tuvalu on 1 October; to Dominica as a republic on 3 November.
- Saint Lucia, Kiribati, and Saint Vincent and the Grenadines (1979) – independence granted to Saint Lucia on 22 February; to Kiribati on 12 July; to Saint Vincent and the Grenadines on 27 October.
- Zimbabwe (as Southern Rhodesia) and Vanuatu (as New Hebrides) (1980) – independence to Zimbabwe as a republic granted on 17 April; to Vanuatu on 1 July.
- Belize (as British Honduras) and Antigua and Barbuda (1981) – independence granted to Belize on 21 September; to Antigua and Barbuda on 1 November.
- Canada (1982) – enactment of the Canada Act, 1982, ends the last remaining reliances of the Canadian Crown on the British Parliament for constitutional amendments.
- Saint Kitts and Nevis (1983) – independence granted on 19 September. Anguilla remains a British overseas territory.
- New South Wales, Queensland, South Australia, Victoria, Western Australia, and Tasmania (1986) - enactment of the Australia Act 1986 brought the Australian states into conformity with the status of the Commonwealth of Australia as a sovereign nation.
- Hong Kong (1997) – returned to the People's Republic of China as a Special Administrative Region on 1 July as per the Sino-British Joint Declaration.

=== Termination of personal union and/or loose judicial ties with the United Kingdom ===
- Ireland (1949) – dominion status ended by unilateral legislative act on 18 April and left the Commonwealth.
- India (1950) – dominion status ended by constitutional amendment on 26 January.
- Pakistan (1956) – dominion status ended with new constitution on 23 March.
- Ghana (1960) – Commonwealth realm status ended by referendum on 1 July.
- South Africa (1961) – dominion status ended by referendum on 31 May and left the Commonwealth.
- Tanganyika (1962) – Commonwealth realm status ended on 9 December.
- Uganda (1963) – Commonwealth realm status ended by Constitution of Uganda constitutional amendment on 9 October.
- Kenya (1964) – Commonwealth realm status ended with new constitution on 12 December.
- Nigeria and the Malawi (1966) – Commonwealth realm status ended by Nigeria via constitutional amendment on 24 May; Malawi via new constitution on 6 July.
- Guyana and The Gambia (1970) – Commonwealth realm statuses ended by Guyana via constitutional amendment effective 17 March; The Gambia via referendum on 14 April.
- Sierra Leone (1971) – Commonwealth realm status ended on 19 April.
- Ceylon (1972) – dominion status ended on 22 May; renamed Sri Lanka.
- Malta (1974) – Commonwealth realm status ended on 13 December.
- Trinidad and Tobago (1976) – Commonwealth realm status ended on 1 March.
- Mauritius (1992) – Commonwealth realm status ended on 12 March.
- Barbados (2021) – Commonwealth realm status ended by constitutional amendment on 30 November.

== Gains ==
- Falkland Islands (1833)
- Rockall (1955) – annexed to the Crown on 18 September.
