= HMS Ethalion (1802) =

Frigate of the Royal Navy

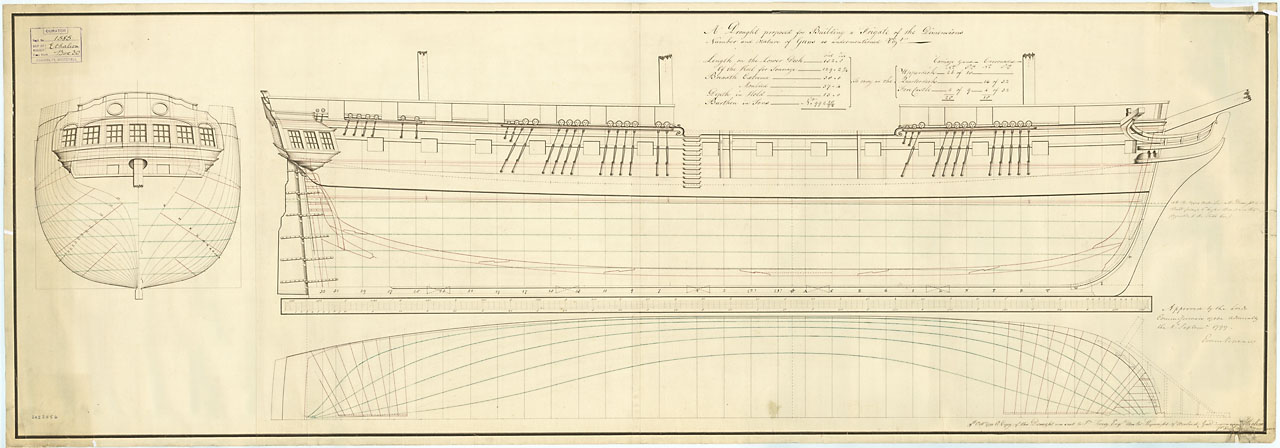
- Plan of HMS Ethalion

History

United Kingdom
- Name: Ethalion
- Builder: Woolwich Dockyard
- Launched: 29 July 1802
- Commissioned: 1803
- Decommissioned: 1816
- In service: As hospital ship, 1823; As breakwater, 1860s
- Fate: Broken up, 1877

General characteristics
- Type: Fifth-rate frigate
- Tons burthen: 996 tons bm
- Armament: 36 guns

HMS Ethalion was a Royal Navy 36-gun frigate, launched in 1802 at Woolwich Dockyard. She was eventually broken up in 1877.

== Service ==
Ethalion entered service in 1803 under Captain Charles Stuart, operating in the North Sea. In May 1804 she captured the 16-gun Dutch brig Union off Bergen. In 1807, command passed to William Charles Fahie, who took Ethalion to the West Indies.

In December 1807 Ethalion was part of the squadron under Admiral Sir Alexander Cochrane that captured the Danish islands of St Thomas on 22 December and Santa Cruz on 25 December. The Danes did not resist and the invasion was bloodless. (Note: A first class share of the prize money awarded in 1816, i.e., the share accruing to each of the captains and commanders, was worth £398 10s 3½d; a fifth-class share, that of a seaman in the fleet, was worth £1 18s 10d.)

On 26 October 1808 Ethalion captured Washington. (Note: A first-class share of the prize money was worth £106 11s 2¾d; a sixth-class share, that of an ordinary seaman, was worth £1 2s 0¾d.)

Ethalion also participated in the invasion of Martinique in 1809 under Captain Thomas John Cochrane.

In April 1809, a strong French squadron arrived at the Îles des Saintes, south of Guadeloupe. There they were blockaded until 14 April, when a British force under Major-General Frederick Maitland and Captain Philip Beaver in Acasta, invaded and captured the islands. Ethalion played a distant part in the Action of 14–17 April 1809.

Even so, she was among the naval vessels that shared in the proceeds of the capture of the islands. (Note: The prize agent for a number of the vessels involved, Henry Abbott, went bankrupt. In May 1835 there was a final payment of a dividend from his estate. A first-class share was worth 10s 2¾d; a sixth-class share was worth 1d. Seventh-class (landsmen) and eighth-class (boys) shares were fractions of a penny, too small to pay.)

In 1810, Ethalion briefly paid off, before returning to service in 1811 off Lisbon under Captain Heywood and then in the Baltic Sea. On 12 April 1812, Ethalion and Clio captured the Opsloe.

Shortly after the outbreak of the War of 1812, on 12 August, Ethalion shared in the seizure of several American vessels: Cuba, Caliban, Edward, Galen, Halcyon, and Cygnet. (Note: Prize money was paid in November 1815. A first-class share was worth £360 2s 3d; a sixth-class share, that of an ordinary seaman, was worth £3 11s 7d.)

Ethalion escorted a convoy from the St Lawrence River on 12 November 1813, but bad weather dispersed the vessels. She recaptured the Pomona (or Pomone), of Teignmouth, on 14 December off the coast of Ireland. Pomona had been a prize to the American privateer Prince de Neufchatel. (Note: A first-class share was worth £230 12s 10d; a sixth-class share was worth £1 8s 8¼d.)

In 1814 Ethalion was operating under Captain William Hugh Dobbie off the Irish Coast and in 1816 was placed in reserve at Woolwich.

== Fate ==
In 1823 Ethalion was converted to a hospital ship, which she remained as until becoming a breakwater in the 1860s. She was eventually broken up in 1877.
