= María Sáez de Vernet =

Argentine writer

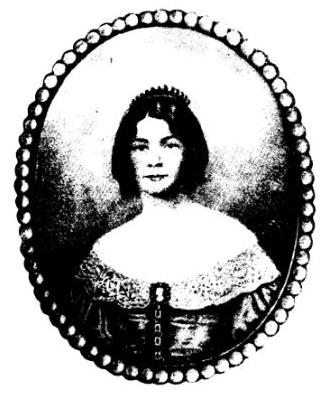
- Born: María Sáez Pérez; 19 November 1800; Montevideo, Viceroyalty of the Río de la Plata
- Died: 20 October 1858 (aged 57); Buenos Aires, Argentina
- Resting place: La Recoleta Cemetery
- Notable work: Diario de 1829 en Malvinas
- Spouse: Luis Vernet (m. 1819)
- Children: 7

María Sáez Pérez de Vernet (19 November 1800 – 20 October 1858) was the wife of Luis Vernet. She wrote a personal diary during her residence in Port Louis, Falkland Islands, which was preserved together with other documents and letters in the Argentine National Archive when her husband's papers were donated to the Argentine National Archive.

== Biography ==
Sáez was born in Montevideo, which at the time was part of the Spanish Viceroyalty of the Río de la Plata. She was the daughter of Francisco Sáez, a wealthy businessman, and Josefa Pérez. On 17 August 1819, she married Luis Vernet, whom she had met when he set up a commercial enterprise with Conrad Rücker. They had seven children.

While living in Puerto Luis on the Falkland Islands Sáez kept a personal diary, which was preserved amongst the archive of her husband's papers donated to the Argentine National Archive. She was accomplished at playing the piano; travelers and personalities who passed through the colony, referred to the "refinement" and cultural level of the Vernets. On several evenings she played the piano and sang. Robert Greenhow wrote that Sáez "played Rossini's music with great gusto."

Sáez died in Buenos Aires in 1858. The vault of the Vernet family is at La Recoleta Cemetery, Buenos Aires.

== Modern response ==
The diary was referenced by the Argentine revisionist author Antonio Montarcé Lastra as part of his argument for Argentina's claim for sovereignty of the Falkland Islands. Sáez was also used as the basis of the principal character in two historical romance novels. Ernesto Cilley Hernández, Sáez's great-grandson, published the diary in bilingual Spanish-English form in 1989.

In 2012, the National Library of the Argentine Republic held a research scholarship contest named for Sáez in relation to Argentina's claim over the Falkland Islands. As part of International Women's Day 2015, the Museo Malvinas e Islas del Atlántico Sur of Buenos Aires presented the exhibition Malvinas, mi casa, which included a series of watercolors reflecting life in the Falklands in 1829, based on Sáez's diary and lectures by her descendants on Argentina's claim to the Falklands.
