= Cape Faraday =

Cape Faraday (60°38′S 45°4′W) is a cape which forms the northern tip of Powell Island in the South Orkney Islands. It was discovered by Captain George Powell and Captain Nathaniel Palmer on the occasion of their joint cruise in December 1821. The name first appears on Powell's chart published in 1822.
