= Reassertion of British sovereignty over the Falkland Islands (1833) =

Re-assertion of British sovereignty over the Falkland Islands (1833)
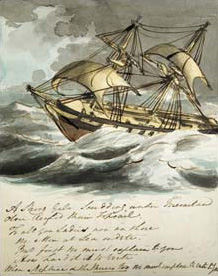
- Sketch of brig-sloop HMS Clio which reasserted British sovereignty in the Falklands
Date	20 December 1832 – 2 January 1833
Location	Falkland Islands
Result	British victory
Territorial changes	British control of the Falkland islands

Belligerents
United Kingdom	United Provinces of the Río de la Plata

Commanders and leaders
John James Onslow	José María Pinedo

Strength
Land: 20 Royal Marines; Naval: 1 Brig-Sloop; 121 man crew	Land: 19 soldiers; Naval: 1 Schooner; 80 man crew

In December 1832, the United Kingdom sent two naval vessels to re-assert British sovereignty over the Falkland Islands (Spanish: Islas Malvinas), after the United Provinces of the Río de la Plata (part of which later became Argentina) ignored British diplomatic protests over the appointment of Luis Vernet as governor of the Falkland Islands and a dispute over fishing rights.

== Background ==
=== Early settlements ===
In 1765, Captain John Byron was searching for the mythical Pepys Island. Byron explored Saunders Island, which lies 1.5 miles (2.5 km) off the coast of West Falkland. He named the harbour Port Egmont, and claimed this and other islands for Britain, on the grounds of prior discovery. The next year Captain John MacBride established a British settlement at Port Egmont. Independently France had established a settlement in 1764 at Fort Saint Louis, which it left in 1767 following protest by Spain, which took over the settlement and renamed it Puerto Soledad.

The British presence in the west continued, until interrupted by Spain, during the Falkland Crisis from 10 July 1770 to 22 January 1771. Economic pressures led Britain to unilaterally withdraw from many overseas settlements in 1774, and they left Port Egmont on 20 May 1774, leaving a plaque asserting their continuing sovereignty over the islands. A few years later, under orders from Madrid, the Spanish demolished the settlement at Port Egmont and removed the plaque. The Spanish settlement at Puerto Soledad was itself withdrawn in 1811.

The islands remained an important outpost for whalers and sealers who used the islands to shelter from the worst of the South Atlantic weather. By merit of their location, the Falkland Islands have often been the last refuge for ships damaged at sea. Most numerous among those using the islands were British and American sealers, where typically between 40 and 50 ships were engaged in hunting fur seals. In 1820, the government of Buenos Aires sought to ratify and formalize control over the Islands as to combat illegal fishing in their waters. David Jewett was appointed naval colonel by Matias de Irigoyen. Later that year, Buenos Aires' Governor Martin Rodriguez named Jewett "commissioner appointed by the Supreme Government of the United Provinces to take possession of the islands in the name of the country to which they belong by natural law". Jewett was sent to the archipelago by orders from Manuel de Sarratea and claimed possession of the islands for the United Provinces of Rio de la Plata, by virtue of inheriting Spain's claim following independence.

=== Split allegiances of settler Luis Vernet ===
In 1823 the United Provinces granted land on East Falkland to Luis Vernet, who sent an expedition to the islands the following year, which failed almost as soon as it landed. Vernet, having become aware of British claims to the islands, sought and received British sanction for a second expedition in 1826, which also failed after arrival in the islands. In 1828, the United Provinces government granted Vernet all of East Falkland, including all its resources, with exemption from taxation if a colony could be established within three years. This time travelling to the Falklands himself, he took settlers, some of them British, and before leaving once again sought permission from the British Consulate in Buenos Aires. After receiving consent, Vernet agreed to provide regular reports to the British consul and expressed the desire for British protection for his settlement should they decide to re-establish their presence in the islands. On Vernet's arrival in the Falklands, he renamed Puerto Soledad to Puerto Luis.

== Inciting incidents ==
=== Vernet proclaimed governor by the United Provinces ===
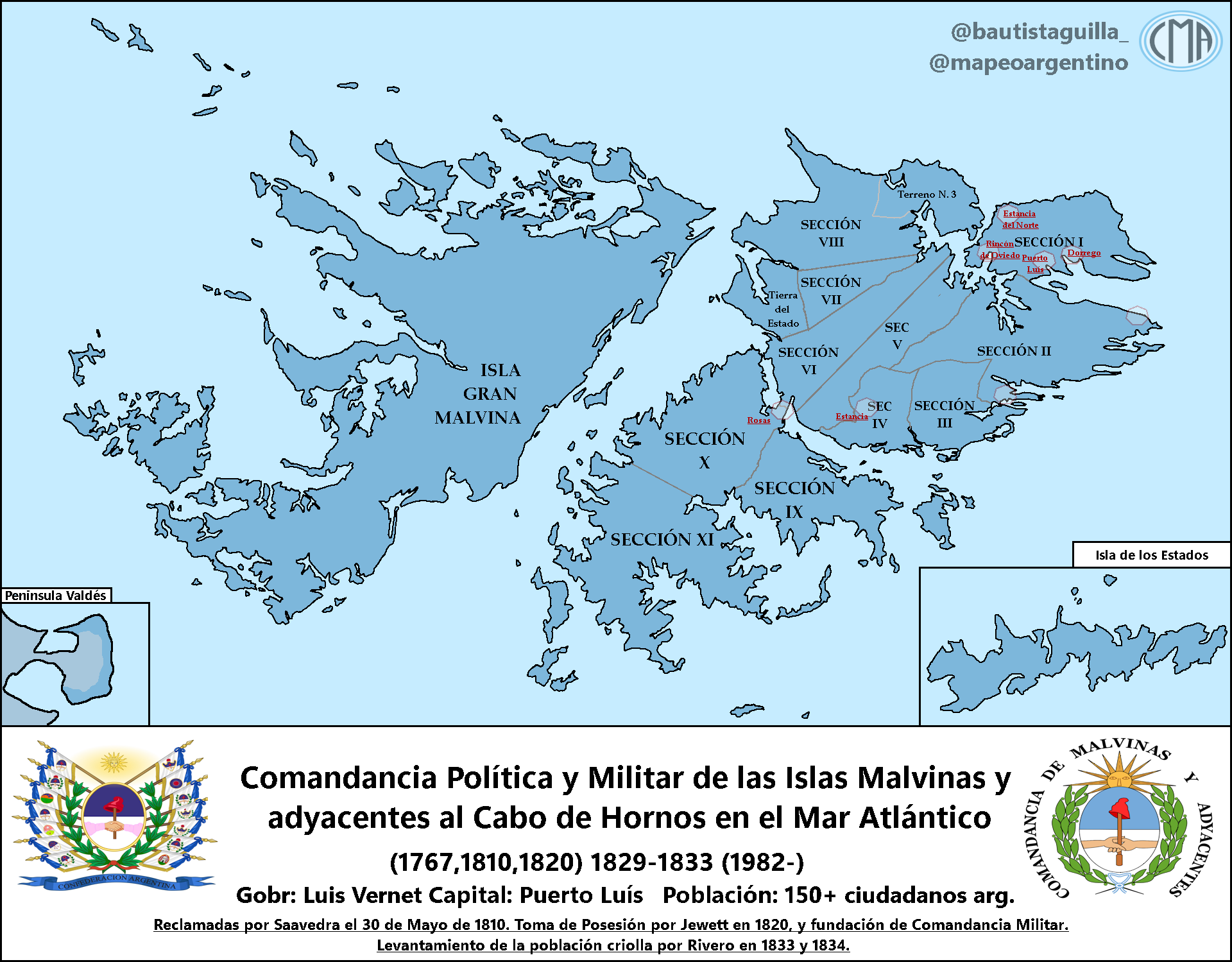
The Islands during the governoship of Luis Vernet

The United Provinces appointed Luis Vernet as governor with rights to seal hunting in the islands. This was disputed by the British and US consulates at Buenos Aires. Vernet provided reports to the British consul during this period.

=== Seal hunting rights and the intervention of the USS Lexington ===
In 1831 Vernet with his newly created authority used the services of a Captain Matthew Brisbane in the ship Betsy to capture three US vessels (Breakwater, Superior and Harriet) that were hunting seals in Falklands waters. The Breakwater escaped but the catch of the other two ships was confiscated and their crews were arrested. Vernet returned to the mainland, bringing senior officers of the US vessels to stand trial for violating restrictions on seal hunting. The US consul protested vehemently against the seizure of US ships and the USS Lexington sailed to the Falklands. The log of the Lexington reports only the destruction of arms and a powder store, though in his claim against the US government for compensation (rejected by the US government of President Grover Cleveland in 1885) Vernet stated that the settlement was destroyed. The islands were declared free from all government and the seven senior members of the settlement, including Vernet and Brisbane, were arrested for piracy and taken to Montevideo, where they were released without charge on the orders of Commodore Rogers.

=== United Provinces attempts to reassert control ===
Following Duncan declaring the islands free of government in December 1831, the United Provinces did not have a government representative in the islands throughout most of 1832. The Buenos Aires government commissioned Major Esteban Mestivier as the new governor of the islands to set up a penal colony, and he was transported to the settlement by Major José María Pinedo, commander of the United Provinces schooner Sarandí in November 1832. Shortly after the Sarandí departed the settlement however, Mestivier's soldiers mutinied and killed him. The mutiny was put down by sailors from the French whaler Jean-Jacques and the British sealer Rapid. Pinedo, with Brisbane as his pilot, returned just before the British arrived.

== Arrival of the squadron ==
The USS Lexington incident finally convinced the British Foreign Office to reassert its sovereignty claim over the islands. Under the command of Captain John James Onslow, the brig-sloop HMS Clio, previously stationed at Rio de Janeiro, reached Port Egmont on 20 December 1832. It was later joined by HMS Tyne. Their first actions were to repair the fort at Port Egmont and affix a notice of possession.

Onslow arrived at Puerto Luis on 2 January 1833. Pinedo sent an officer to the British ship, where he was presented with the following written request to replace the Argentine flag with the British one, and leave the location.

I have to direct you that I have received directions from His Excellency and Commander-in-Chief of His Britannic Majesty's ships and vessels of war, South America station, in the name of His Britannic Majesty, to exercise the rights of sovereignty over these Islands. It is my intention to hoist to-morrow the national flag of Great Britain on shore when I request you will be pleased to haul down your flag on shore and withdraw your force, taking all stores belonging to your Government.

Pinedo entertained plans for resisting, but did not because of his obvious numerical inferiority and the fact that approximately 80% of his forces were British mercenaries, who refused to fight their countrymen. The British forces disembarked on 3 January and switched the flags, delivering the Argentine one to Pinedo, who left on 5 January.

Recognising Vernet's settlement had British permission, Onslow set about ensuring the continuation of that settlement for the replenishment of passing ships. The gauchos had not been paid since Vernet's departure and were anxious to return to the mainland. Onslow persuaded them to stay by paying them in silver for provisions and promising that in the absence of Vernet's authority they could earn their living from the feral cattle on the islands.

The British vessels did not stay long and departed two days later, leaving William Dickson (Vernet's storekeeper) in charge of the settlement. Dickson was provided with a flagpole and instructed to fly the British flag whenever a vessel was in harbour.

Argentina claims that the population of the islands was expelled in 1833; however, both British and Argentine sources from the time, including the log of the ARA Sarandí, suggest that the colonists were encouraged to remain under Vernet's deputy, Matthew Brisbane.

== Aftermath ==
=== Initial instability under British control ===
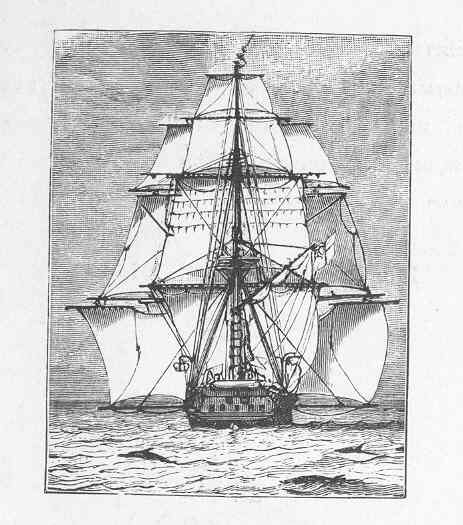
HMS Beagle

HMS Beagle arrived on 15 March 1833. Vernet dispatched his deputy Matthew Brisbane to the islands to take charge of his settlement March 1833. Meeting with Captain Fitzroy of the Beagle, he was encouraged to continue with Vernet's enterprise provided there was no attempt to further the ambitions of the United Provinces. Like Onslow before him, Fitzroy was forced to use his powers of persuasion to encourage the gauchos to continue working in Vernet's establishment:

During the month we remained in Berkeley Sound, I had much trouble with the crews of whaling or small sealing vessels, as well as with the settlers, who all seemed to fancy that because the British flag was re-hoisted on the Falklands, they were at liberty to do what they pleased with Mr. Vernet's private property, as well as with the wild cattle and horses. The gauchos wished to leave the place, and return to the Plata, but as they were the only useful labourers on the islands, in fact, the only people on whom any dependance could be placed for a regular supply of fresh beef, I interested myself as much as possible to induce them to remain, and with partial success, for seven staid out of twelve.

Arriving in the Falklands, Fitzroy expected to find the thriving settlement reported by another British officer. Instead, he found the settlement in a derelict state, which Brisbane blamed upon the Lexington's raid. Fitzroy questioned several members of the settlement who corroborated Brisbane's account:

Next morning Brisbane came on board with his papers, and I was quite satisfied with their tenor, and the explanation which he gave me of his business. Some misapprehension having since arisen about his being authorized by Vernet to act in his stead, I may here mention again (though no longer of any material consequence), that Brisbane's instructions from Vernet authorized him to act as his private agent only, to look after the remains of his private property, and that they had not the slightest reference to civil or military authority. This settled, I went to Port Louis, but was indeed disappointed. Instead of the cheerful little village I once anticipated finding – a few half-ruined stone cottages; some straggling huts built of turf; two or three stove boats; some broken ground where gardens had been, and where a few cabbages or potatoes still grew; some sheep and goats; a few long-legged pigs; some horses and cows; with here and there a miserable-looking human being – were scattered over the fore-ground of a view which had dark clouds, ragged-topped hills, and a wild waste of moorland to fill up the distance. "How is this?" said I, in astonishment, to Mr. Brisbane; "I thought Mr. Vernet's colony was a thriving and happy settlement. Where are the inhabitants? the place seems deserted as well as ruined." "Indeed, Sir, it was flourishing," said he, "but the Lexington ruined it: Captain Duncan's men did such harm to the houses and gardens. I was myself treated as a pirate—rowed stern foremost on board the Lexington – abused on her quarter-deck most violently by Captain Duncan – treated by him more like a wild beast than a human being – and from that time guarded as a felon, until I was released by order of Commodore Rogers." "But," I said, "where are the rest of the settlers? I see but half a dozen, of whom two are old black women; where are the gauchos who kill the cattle?" "Sir, they are all in the country. They have been so much alarmed by what has occurred, and they dread the appearance of a ship of war so much, that they keep out of the way till they know what she is going to do." I afterwards interrogated an old German, while Brisbane was out of sight, and after him a young native of Buenos Ayres, who both corroborated Brisbane's account.

On departing from the islands Fitzroy expressed his concern for the settlement with its lack of regular authority in a virtually lawless group of islands. Fitzroy's concerns were justified, as on 26 August 1833, eight members of the settlement led by Antonio Rivero took up weapons partly due to the re-imposition of Vernet's paper vouchers as wages, killing five of the senior members of the settlement, including Brisbane and Dickson. Other members of the settlement took refuge on a nearby island until rescued in October 1833.

=== Installation of British resident ===
Lieutenant Henry Smith was installed as the first British resident in January 1834; he immediately set about establishing British authority, arresting the murderers and sending them to London, although they eventually escaped punishment as the British courts did not have direct jurisdiction over Britain's colonies. The United Kingdom has held the territory ever since but for a two-month period after the 1982 invasion, during the Falklands War.

In 1834 on his second visit Charles Darwin commented that:

After the possession of these miserable islands had been contested by France, Spain, and England, they were left uninhabited. The government of Buenos Aires then sold them to a private individual, but likewise used them, as old Spain had done before, for a penal settlement. England claimed her right and seized them. The Englishman who was left in charge of the flag was consequently murdered. A British officer was next sent, unsupported by any power: and when we arrived, we found him in charge of a population, of which rather more than half were runaway rebels and murderers.

— The Voyage of the Beagle

In Buenos Aires, Vernet was effectively bankrupt and attempts to obtain compensation from the US Government for losses from the Lexington raid proved fruitless. The situation in Buenos Aires was chaotic and diplomatic relations with the US remained ruptured till 1839. He made several approaches to the British Government asking for support to re-establish his business at Port Louis, receiving support from Woodbine Parish (British chargé d'affaires in Buenos Aires from 1825 to 1832) as the best qualified person to develop the islands.

Vernet wrote to Lieutenant Smith offering advice, which was gratefully received and acted upon. Smith repeatedly urged Vernet to return to Port Luis but as Vernet became increasingly involved in the territorial dispute with the government in Buenos Aires all communications ceased and no more accounts were sent. Vernet approached Lieutenant Robert Lowcay, who had succeeded Lieutenant Smith as British resident, to retrieve his property however was rebuffed. Later Vernet was requested to remove his property as the British government could not be responsible for it.

== Bibliography ==
- Cawkell, Mary Brown Rowan (1983). The Falkland Story, 1592–1982. Anthony Nelson. ISBN 978-0-904614-08-4.
- Cawkell, Mary Brown Rowan; Maling, Derek Hylton; Cawkell, E. M. (1960). The Falkland Islands. Macmillan.
- Cawkell, Mary Brown Rowan (2001). The History of the Falkland Islands. Anthony Nelson. ISBN 978-0-904614-55-8.
- Dickens, Paul D. (1929). "The Falkland Islands Dispute between the United States and Argentina". The Hispanic American Historical Review. 9 (4). JSTOR: 471–487. doi:10.1215/00182168-9.4.471.
- Shuttleworth, Nina Louisa Kay; Parish, Woodbine (1910). Life of Sir Woodbine Parish, K.C.H., F.R.S., 1796–1882 ... With Portraits and Illustrations. London.
- Tatham, David, ed. (2008). The Dictionary of Falklands Biography (including South Georgia): From Discovery Up to 1981. D. Tatham. ISBN 978-0-9558985-0-1.
