= Luis Vernet =

Argentine merchant from Hamburg of Huguenot descent

Luis Elías Vernet
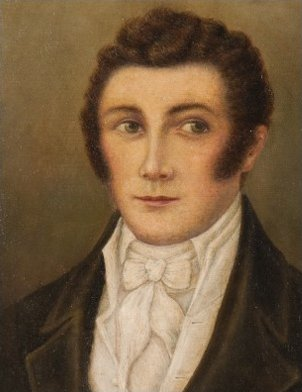
- Born: March 6, 1791; Hamburg, Holy Roman Empire
- Died: January 17, 1871 (aged 79); San Isidro, Argentina
- Resting place: La Recoleta Cemetery
- Monuments: Mount Vernet on East Falkland is named in his memory.
- Citizenship: Argentine
- Occupations: Merchant; Businessman; Public officer
- Known for: Being appointed as Military and Civil Commander of Falkland Islands and the Islands adjacent to Cape Horn by the Government of Buenos Aires
- Title: Military and Civil Commander of the Falkland Islands and the Islands adjacent to Cape Horn
- Term: 1829–1831
- Successor: Juan Esteban Mestivier
- Spouse: María Saez Pérez (m. 1819; died 1858)
- Children: Luis Emilio, Luisa, Sofía, Malvina, Gustavo, Carlos Federico

Luis Vernet (born Louis Élie Vernet; March 6, 1791 – January 17, 1871) was a merchant from Hamburg of Huguenot descent. Vernet established a settlement on East Falkland in 1828, after first seeking approval from both the British and Argentine authorities. As such, Vernet is a controversial figure in the history of the Falkland Islands sovereignty dispute.

== Biography ==
Vernet was born in Hamburg but later claimed a French birthplace in his effort to have the French Government intercede with the British Government on his behalf. As a result, some sources refer to him a native of Hamburg, while others refer to him as French born.

Vernet variously referred to himself as Ludwig, Louis, Lewis or Luis depending on the language he was using. He was multilingual, being fluent in German, French, English and Spanish.

=== Family background ===
Elias Luis Vernet (Vernet and Louis Elie) was born on 6 March 1791 in Hamburg. His ancestors were Huguenots, probably from Avignon, who settled first in Belgium and then Hamburg. His parents were the tobacco and tea merchant Jacques Vernet (1730–1813) and Maria Vernet. He had three brothers, Peter Alexander, Emilio and Federico.

At the age of 14, in 1805, he was appointed by his father to a trading company and sent to Philadelphia. There he joined the trading house of Krumbhaar, staying with Lewis Krumbhaar, who became a father figure. He became a merchant travelling to Portugal, Brazil and Hamburg.

=== Emigration to South America ===
The U.S. government sent a diplomatic Commission to the newly independent United Provinces of the River Plate. Luis Vernet took passage in the frigate USS Congress, arriving in Montevideo in February 1818 (whilst it was a Brazilian possession) and on to Buenos Aires. He remained in Buenos Aires and organized a trading company with the port of Hamburg.

Together with the Montevideo-based Conrad Rücker (died 1866, Hamburg), he ran a trading company until 1821. Rücker was also his best man when on 17 August 1819 he wed María Saez Pérez (1800–1858) from Montevideo. With her he had seven children: Luis Emilio, Luisa, Sofia, Matilde (1830–1924), Gustavo, Carlos Federico.

Later he established an Estancia about 100 km south of Buenos Aires on the Río Salado, where he captured and slaughtered wild cattle. At this stage this represented the border of the colonised areas.

=== Falkland Islands venture ===
Luis Vernet had a close personal friendship with Jorge Pacheco, one of the heroes of the Liberation War and the British invasions of the River Plate. Pacheco was owed money by the Government of Buenos Aires and entered into an agreement with Vernet, whereby Vernet would support Pacheco until the debt was repaid, whereupon Vernet would receive half of the money owed. Vernet learned of the wild cattle in the Falklands through his wife María, who was related to a former Spanish Governor of Puerto Soledad, and conceived of a plan to exploit the cattle in the islands. Together with Pacheco he approached the Government in Buenos Aires with a plan to establish a settlement to exploit the wild cattle. In 1823, the United Provinces of the River Plate granted by decree rights to Jorge Pacheco and Luis Vernet. Governor Martin Rodriguez offered Pacheco the usufruct of the wild cattle in the Falkland Islands as payment for his debt. At first Vernet rejected the idea, but after reviewing Pacheco's claim and finding them tenuous, he accepted the offer. On August 5, 1823, Vernet and Pacheco signed a contract under which Pacheco would negotiate the terms of the grant with the government and Vernet would manage the enterprise. Under the terms of the usufruct the partners could either travel to the islands themselves or appoint a 3rd party. Pacheco submitted his proposal and on August 28 the Government granted him by decree the requested rights.

Following the grant, Pacheco and Vernet were approached by Robert Schofield, a British emigre to Uruguay, requesting a grant under the 3rd party rights of the usufruct. Schofield's involvement proved to be a disaster. One of the two ships transporting the expedition was nearly seized by Schofield's creditors as it had not been paid for and Vernet was forced to provide surety. Schofield himself did not travel to the islands, instead trusting command to Pablo Areguati. Travelling to the islands in 1824, the first expedition failed almost as soon as it landed, a week after arrival Argeguati sent a letter to Pacheco describing how the five horses that had survived the voyage were lame and they were unable to hunt cattle due to the ferocious nature of the bulls. The expedition was barely surviving on rabbits and Pacheco feared they would perish. The letter arrived two days after the contract with Schofield was definitised, so the partners were compelled to arrange a relief mission. The expedition was soon back in Buenos Aires with nothing to show for it other than massive debt, which was exacerbated shortly after by Schofield's death. At this point, Pacheco was so discouraged with the enterprise that he planned to sell his share for a small sum of money; instead, Vernet offered him the profits resulting from the capture of wild calves.

Undeterred, Vernet persisted, but by now was aware of conflicting British claims to the islands and sought permission from the British consulate before departing for the islands. The second expedition was delayed until Winter 1826 by a Brazilian blockade, this did not succeed as Vernet had hoped. The expedition intended to exploit the feral cattle on the islands but the boggy conditions meant the Gauchos could not catch cattle in their traditional way. Vernet concluded that in order to succeed the horses would need to be retrained and set to work with the result that by 1828 he had a troop of well-trained horses.

In January 1828, he approached the Buenos Aires Government but they were unable to help. Instead, the government granted Vernet all of East Falkland including all its resources, and exempted him from taxation if a colony could be established within three years. He took settlers, later joined by the British Captain Matthew Brisbane (who had sailed to the islands earlier with Weddell), and before leaving once again sought permission from the British Consulate in Buenos Aires. The British asked for a report for the British government on the islands, and Vernet asked for British protection should they return. Vernet arrived in Puerto Soledad in 1829 and reverted to the use of the original French name as Puerto Luis. Vernet was anxious to establish the colony quickly due to the promise that it would be free from taxation if it could be established within 3 years.

By 1829, the indiscriminate activities of North American sealers had severely depleted the rookeries on the islands. In order to control island resources, Vernet applied to the authorities in Buenos Aires for a warship to put an end to these activities. The authorities were unable to provide one and instead appointed Vernet as Military and Civil Commander of Falkland Islands and the Islands adjacent to Cape Horn by the Government of Buenos Aires (his appointment was in the name of the Republic of Buenos Aires). A proclamation naming Vernet as governor was issued by the Government in Buenos Aires on 10 June 1829 In addition to the proclamation giving Vernet the authority to act with his own means, he was provided with 4 × 8-pdr cannons and 50 rifles, plus blacksmithing tools.

The appointment of Vernet was challenged by the British consul in Buenos Aires, who restated the previous British claim to the Islands. Vernet remained on good terms with the British consul, Sir Woodbine Parish, with whom he continued to correspond with and report his progress. In reference to the announcement of his appointment, Vernet later told Parish he had accepted the appointment out of concern that if another governor were appointed it might be detrimental to his business interests.

Vernet sought to assert a grant of a monopoly on seal hunting and one of his first acts was to attempt to curb seal hunting on the Islands by others, to conserve the seal population for his own dealings. This act was disputed by both the British and American consuls in Buenos Aires, each asserting their right to continue exploiting the natural resources in the islands. In 1831, Vernet seized the American ships Harriet, Breakwater and Superior for breaking his restrictions on seal hunting. Property on board the ships was seized and the Harriet along with her captain returned to Buenos Aires to stand trial, with Vernet also returning for the trial. As a result, in 1831 the USS Lexington raided the islands. In January 1833, a British task force re-established British rule on the Falkland Islands, ending the influence of Buenos Aires over them.

=== Vernet's role in the dispute over the Falkland Islands ===
Vernet never set foot in the Falklands again. Recognising that Vernet had British permission to be in the islands, the settlement in the Falklands was encouraged to continue. Vernet's deputy, Matthew Brisbane, returned in March 1833 and endeavoured to resurrect the settlement but later that year was murdered alongside senior members of the settlement by disgruntled Gauchos.

The settlement at Port Louis was left in a derelict state following the murders, Lt Smith the first British resident set about making the buildings habitable. As a naval settlement the issue of Vernet's property became a matter for the admiralty and initially Lt Smith was instructed to take care of Vernet's property and provide accounts to Vernet.

Page 1 of the 1835 accounts prepared for Luis Vernet. Lopez, Roxa, Coronel and Basilio were still employed by Vernet.

Page 2 of the 1835 accounts prepared for Luis Vernet.

Page 3 of the 1835 accounts prepared for Luis Vernet.

In Buenos Aires, Vernet was effectively bankrupt and attempts to obtain compensation from the US Government for losses from the Lexington raid proved fruitless. The situation in Buenos Aires was chaotic and diplomatic relations with the US remained ruptured till 1839. He made several approaches to the British Government asking for support to re-establish his business at Port Louis, receiving support from Woodbine Parish (British chargé d'affaires in Buenos Aires from 1825 to 1832) as the best qualified person to develop the islands.

Page 1 of a covering letter from Luis Vernet requesting the commander of British squadron in the South Atlantic pass correspondence to Lt Smith. The letter requests the disbursement of the property of victims of the Gaucho murders of August 1834.

Page 2

Letter from Luis Vernet to Commander in Chief of the Royal Navy Squadron in Rio de Janeiro. Letter praises administration of his affairs in the Falkland Islands.

Page 2

Vernet wrote to Lt Smith offering advice, which was gratefully received and acted upon. Lt Smith repeatedly urged Vernet to return to Port Louis but as Vernet became increasingly involved in the territorial dispute with the Government in Buenos Aires all communications ceased and no more accounts were sent. An approach to Lt Lowcay to retrieve his property was rebuffed but later he was requested to remove his property as the Government could not be responsible for it.

Nevertheless, Vernet continued to influence the development of the Falkland Islands. He sold part of his holdings in the islands to British merchant G.T. Whittington, who formed the Falkland Islands Commercial Fishery and Agricultural Association. This organisation was a key factor in persuading the British Government to establish a colony in the islands, rather than a military base. He provided Samuel Lafone, a businessman key to the formation of the Falkland Islands Company, with maps of the island and knowledge of the potential of the feral cattle population of the islands.

=== Later years ===
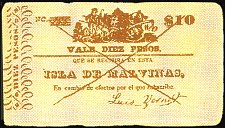
Vernet's settlement with the British Government was reduced in order to settle promissory notes such as this left in the Falkland Islands

Vernet was later credited with the discovery of a preservative treatment for leather; the process permitted the rapid growth of leather exports to Europe and elsewhere. He would also develop a method to improve the storage of oils and spirits. The money he made with these processes enabled him to travel to London in 1852 to press his claim for compensation for his losses. He claimed a sum total of £14,295 for horses, domesticated cattle, stone houses and beef left at the settlement, which with interest was inflated to £28,000. After some five years of wrangling he was awarded £2,400 in a settlement of his claim of which he received £1,850 the balance being used to pay off his promissory notes. Although he signed a waiver against further claims he attempted to press for further compensation in 1858 without success.

Vernet returned to Buenos Aires and in 1869 signed a contract with his eldest son to pursue claims against the US Government for the Lexington raid, against Britain for unsatisfactory compensation and against Silas E. Burrows, owner of the Superior for breaking the contract signed by Captains Davison and Congar in 1831.

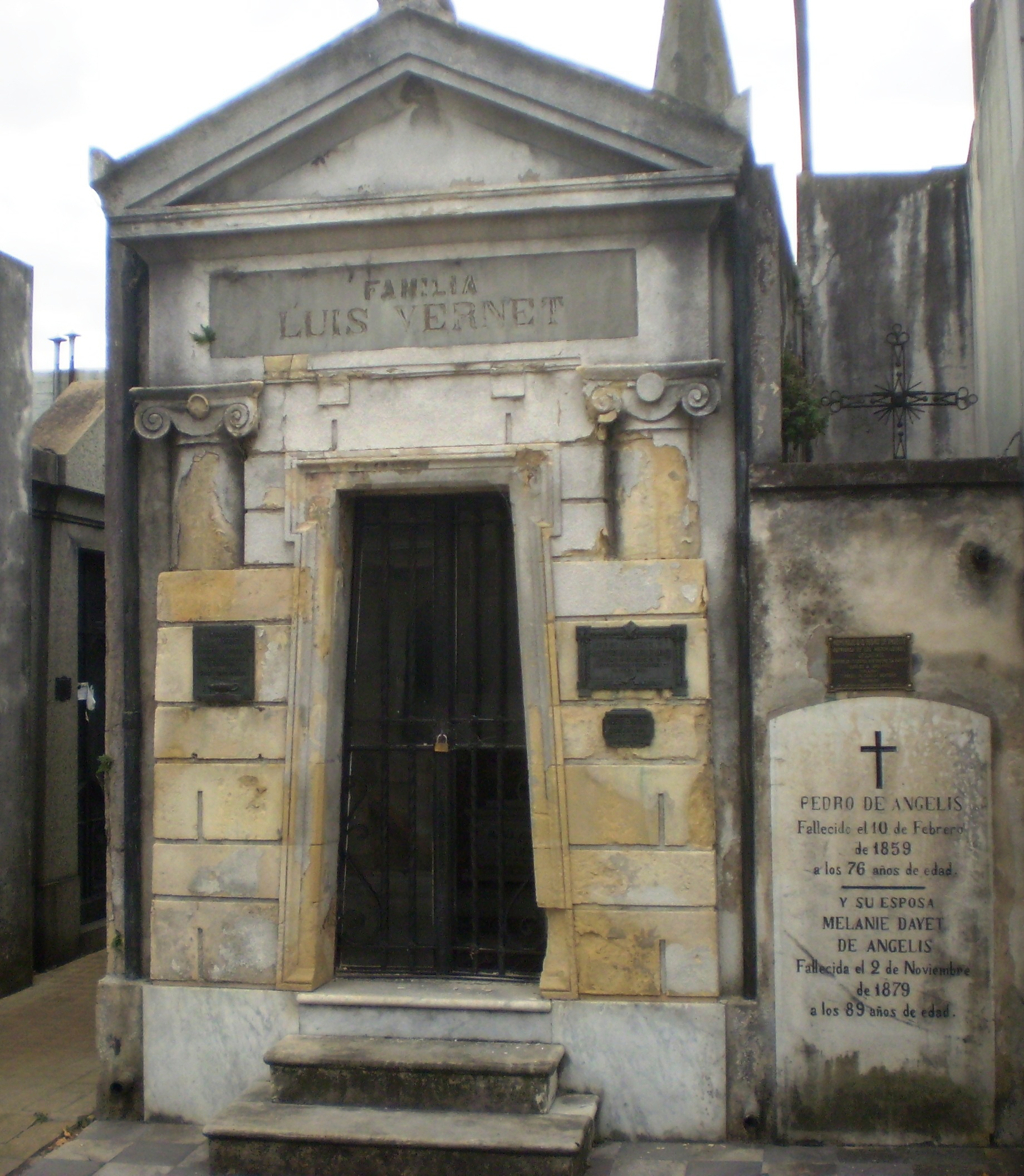
Luis Vernet's mausoleum in La Recoleta Cemetery, Buenos Aires.

Luis Vernet died in San Isidro, Buenos Aires, in 1871, and was interred in La Recoleta Cemetery.

The Vernet family persisted with the claims. In 1868, whilst Vernet was still alive, the Argentine government had granted Isla de los Estados part of Vernet's original 1828 concession to Luis Piedra Buena. His sons successfully petitioned the Argentine Government and received compensation for this loss but not for the loss of East Falkland. In 1884, he received support from the Government of President Julio Argentino Roca who reopened both the Lexington claim with the US and the Falklands claim with Britain. The US Government of President Cleveland rejected the claim in 1885. Argentine government protests over the Falklands had ceased with the signing of the Convention of Settlement but were revived in the Affair of the Map in 1884.

== Legacy ==
Vernet is considered as a national hero in Argentina as he was proclaimed Military and Civil Commander of Falkland Islands and the Islands adjacent to Cape Horn by the Republic of Buenos Aires in 1829, on the other hand he is also perceived as an unpatriotic merchant who acted in his own interest and made a pact with the British. The US Government accused Vernet of piracy, whilst the British regard him as an entrepreneur who began the opening up of the Falkland Islands economy.

Vernet was a complex character who appeared to be a man of intelligence, charm and drive. He was not always truthful in what he said and his falsehoods have sometimes misled historians.
