= USS Lexington (1825) =

1825 US Navy sloop-of-war

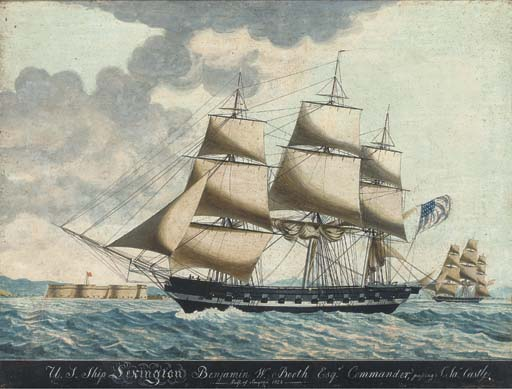
- USS Lexington off Smyrna in 1828 by R. Corsini

History

United States
- Name: USS Lexington
- Laid down: 1825
- Commissioned: 11 June 1826
- Decommissioned: 16 November 1830
- Recommissioned: 31 May 1831
- Decommissioned: 26 February 1855
- Fate: Sold 1860

General characteristics
- Type: Sloop-of-war
- Tons burthen: 691
- Length: 127 ft (39 m)
- Beam: 33 ft 6 in (10.21 m)
- Draft: 16 ft 6 in (5.03 m)
- Propulsion: Sail
- Complement: 190 officers and enlisted
- Armament: 24 × 24-pounder guns

The second USS Lexington was a sloop in the United States Navy built at the New York Navy Yard in Brooklyn, New York, in 1825; and commissioned on 11 June 1826, Master Commandant William B. Shubrick in command.

The San Francisco Call, July 14, 1900

The new sloop was first stationed off Labrador to protect American fishing vessels. After returning to the United States, she was sent to Trinidad to return the body of Commodore Oliver Hazard Perry who had died in schooner Nonsuch on 23 August 1819 while returning from Angostura, Venezuela, where he had arranged for Venezuelan help to suppress piracy off the Spanish Main.

In 1827 Lexington sailed to the Mediterranean Sea where she cruised for three years. In 1828, her commander, Benjamin W. Booth, likely commissioned the above painting while she was off the coast of Smyrna. Returning to Norfolk, Virginia in the fall of 1830, she decommissioned at Norfolk Navy Yard on 16 November. Recommissioning on 31 May 1831, Master Commandant Silas M. Duncan in command, she proceeded to Rio de Janeiro, Brazil, for duty with the Brazil Squadron until late 1836. Notably, in 1831 Duncan raided Luis Vernet's settlement at Puerto Luis in the Falkland Islands where the American ships Harriet, Superior and Breakwater had been captured in a dispute over fishing and seal hunting rights, prompting Duncan to take seven prisoners aboard the Lexington and charge them with piracy; which precipitated the re-establishment of British rule. She then sailed around Cape Horn to protect American commerce on the Pacific coast. On 1 March 1834 at Rio de Janeiro, diplomatist Edmund Roberts, then returning from his first mission aboard Peacock, boarded Lexington under the command of Captain M’Keever for return to Boston Harbor on 24 April.

Returning to the east coast in 1840, Lexington was converted into a store ship and her 24 medium 24-pounders were replaced by six 32-pounder carronades. In April 1843, she sailed to the Mediterranean and served there for two years.

The outbreak of war with Mexico in the spring of 1846 found Lexington operating along the west coast of North America. During the conflict, she transported troops and assisted in the blockade. On 12 January 1847, she landed a party at San Blas, Nayarit, and captured several enemy guns. After the war Lexington remained on the California coast, a source of stability and security during the territory's transition to U.S. control and in the earlier months of the gold rush of 1849.

Returning to the United States East Coast early in 1850, Lexington operated on the eastern seaboard until getting underway from New York Harbor 18 June 1853 to join Commodore Matthew C. Perry's expedition to Japan. After the success of this notable expedition, Lexington remained in the Orient before returning to New York, where she decommissioned on 26 February 1855. The sloop was sold in 1860.
