= HMS Clio (1807) =

Cruizer-class brig-sloop of the Royal Navy

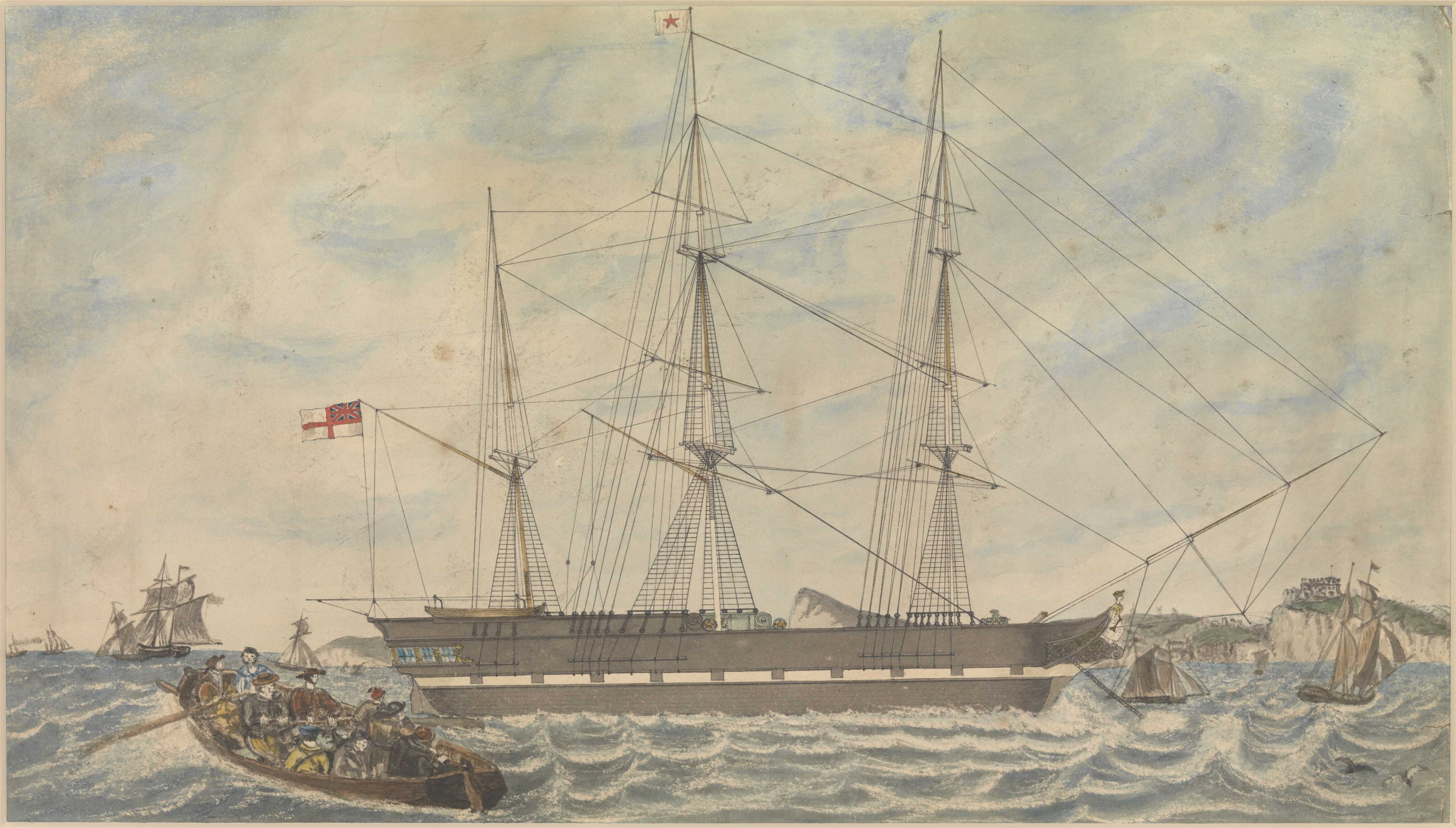
- Clio in 1824

History

United Kingdom
- Name: HMS Clio
- Namesake: Clio
- Builder: James Betts, Mistleythorn
- Launched: 10 January 1807
- Commissioned: February 1807
- Decommissioned: 1816
- Recommissioned: February 1823
- Decommissioned: 1845
- Fate: Broken up, 1845

General characteristics
- Class & type: Cruizer-class brig-sloop
- Tons burthen: 389 35/94 (bm )
- Length: Overall: 100 ft 0 in (30.5 m); Keel: 77 ft 8 in (23.7 m)
- Beam: 30 ft 9 in (9.4 m)
- Depth of hold: 13 ft 11 in (4.2 m)
- Sail plan: Brig
- Complement: 121
- Armament: 16 × 32-pounder carronades + 2 × 6-pounder bow guns

HMS Clio was a Cruizer-class brig-sloop of the Royal Navy, launched at James Betts' shipyard in Mistleythorn in Essex on 10 January 1807. Her establishment was 71 officers and men, 24 boys and 20 marines. She served in the Baltic during the Napoleonic Wars, accomplished the re-establishment of British rule on the Falkland Islands in 1833, and participated in the First Opium War. She was broken up in 1845.

== Napoleonic Wars ==
In February 1807 Commander Thomas Folliott Baugh commissioned her and sailed her to the Leith Station on the North Sea. Here he succeeded in taking several prizes, but not until 1808.

The first appears to have been the Helyra, Hook, master, from Bergen, which Clio sent into Leith in July. Then on 21 September 1808, while she was cruising off Fleckoro, Clio captured a small Danish privateer armed with six guns and carrying a crew of eleven men. The captured vessel arrived at Leith on 12 October.

On 7 December she captured the Vrouw Heltya.

On 30 March 1808, during the Gunboat War, Clio entered Tórshavn, the capital of the Faroe Islands, and briefly captured the fort at Skansin. The fort surrendered without firing a shot as the landing party approached. The landing party spiked the fort's eight 18-pounder guns and took all the smaller guns and weapons before leaving. Shortly after, on 6 May, a German privateer who had assumed the name "Baron von Hompesch" plundered the defenceless city and seized the property of the Danish Crown Monopoly. The Admiralty Prize Court, however, refused to condemn it as a lawful prize. Later, after the Jørgen Jørgensen affair (see also HMS Talbot), Britain declared the Faroese, the Icelanders, and the settlers in Greenland as "stranger friends" who were to be left in peace.

After this adventure Clio captured some more Danish vessels. On 10 August she captured the Vrou Sophia. On 1 September she captured the Junge Jacob and the Wilhelmina Frederica. On 21 September she captured two more, names unknown, which she sent in to Gothenburg.

More small prizes followed in 1809. On 23 February 1809, Clio took five Danish vessels. Another account has her capturing seven Danish privateers and arriving at Whitby with one of them on 26 February.

She detained an American vessel that was sailing from Hambro to Petersburg and sent her into Leith, where the vessel arrived on 23 May. On 7 September she captured the Danish galliot Providentia and on 14 September the sloop Speculation. On 7 November she, with Childers in company, captured Danish schooner No. 32. Then on 15 and 16 November she captured the Danish vessels Three Children, Perlin, St Ola, and Fine Smaakin. One of these may have been the vessel that arrived at Leith on the 17th. Two more Danish vessels arrived at Leith on 5 December.

Baugh was promoted to Post-captain on 21 October 1810. While temporarily under the command of Lieutenant M.J. Popplewell (acting), she captured the Henrietta on 3 December. That same day she was in company when Pyramus captured the Danish vessel Fanoe.

Baugh's replacement was Commander William Farrington. He too captured small prizes. On 12 March 1811, Clio, with Egeria in company, captured the Danish brig Krabbes Minde. Then on 5 May she captured Danish Crown schooner No. 51. On 11 May two Danish vessels arrived at Leith that the frigate Alexandria and Clio had captured.

Unknown to the British, Danish Captain Hans Peter Holm had returned to Egersund (SW Norway) with Lolland and four other brigs. On 1 May 1811, the British sent four boats from Clio, Belette, and Cherokee, into the western end of the sound, expecting to capture some shipping or do other mischief. The circumstances of locality and wind did not permit the Danish brigs to enter the sound from the further end, but Holm sent the Danish ships’ boats under Lieutenant Niels Gerhardt Langemach, up the sound to oppose the British. Some of the Danes landed to set an ambush from the cliff tops, whilst the armed boats were hidden behind a skerry. As the British rowed boldly in, they met unexpected fire from howitzers and muskets; they immediately withdrew, with the Danish boats in pursuit. The Danes captured one of the British boats and her crew of an officer and 17 men, who had come from Belette, and would have captured more but for the confusion that an explosion of a powder keg on one of the Danish boats caused. This enabled the remaining British boats to reach the protection of their squadron.

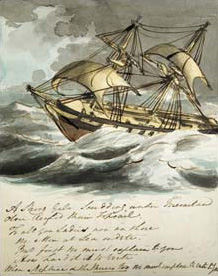
Sketch of a brig-sloop, probably HMS Clio, by Cmdr. William Farrington, ca. 1812, Peabody Essex Museum

Clio's primary occupation was escorting convoys to and from the Baltic. Still, on 12 April 1812, Clio and Ethalion captured the Opsloe. Clio was also in sight when Ethalion captured the Unitas and Gunilde Maria that same day. On 25 September she was in company, together with the gun-brig Bruizer, when Hamadryad recaptured the galliot Expedition.

On 7 October, Clio captured the Danish sloop Sorenen. About a week later, on 13 or 14 October 1812 in the Baltic, off Hermeren, boats from Clio and Hamdryad captured the French privateer lugger Pilotin, which was carrying four 12-pounder carronades and had a crew of 31 men. Three Danish luggers, each mounting two guns, came out from Rødby to support Pilotin but retreated when the British boats advanced towards them. On the same day they recaptured the Swedish schooner Johannes.

On 23 October Clio, Oberon and Chanticleer detained the Jonge Henrick. The next day, Clio and Oberon captured the Danish privateer Wegvusende. The same vessels were also involved in the capture of the privateer Stafeten on 24 December.

On 17 November Clio captured the Dutch vessel Hoffnung and three days later the Danish galliot Cecilia. She captured another Danish galliot, the Dorothea Elizabeth, on 9 December. She also captured the Gode Hensight on 2 December. On 27 December a third galliot fell prey – the Oprigtig Wenskab.

On 2 February 1813 she captured the Danish sloop Junge Jacob, from and of Bergen. She arrived at Aberdeen on 9 February. Junge Jacob had been sailing from North Bergen to the Mediterranean.

The capture of another privateer punctuated the captures of merchantmen. Clio sent in to Leith a small Danish privateer cutter of three (or four) guns and 22 men that she had taken on 22 October off Hiteroe. The privateer had not yet captured anything.

== Post-war ==
From 1816 to 1822 Clio was at Chatham, first in ordinary and then being fitted for sea. In February 1823 she was commissioned under Commander Charles Strangways for the Nore.

From 1826 to early 1827 her captain was Commander Robert Aitchinson, and she performed anti-smuggling patrols in the North Sea. Then in April 1827 Commander Robert Deans took command. Clio was at the Nore and from 1828 to 1829 at Cork. Between December 1829 and July 1830 she was at Plymouth being fitted as a ship sloop.

From 30 April 1830 to 17 June 1833 Clio was under Commander John James Onslow. Around 19 July 1830 she sailed for South America, and on 15 December she was in Rio de Janeiro. Next, on 2 January 1833, Clio participated in the re-establishment of British rule on the Falkland Islands. Onslow arrived at Luis Vernet's settlement at Port Louis to request that the Argentine authorities replace the flag of the United Provinces of the River Plate with the British one and leave the islands. Lieutenant-Colonel José María Pinedo, of the schooner Sarandi considered resisting, but as most of his crew were British, thought better of it and sailed on 5 January.

In July 1833 Clio was in Portsmouth to be fitted as a 16-gun brig again. In 1835 she was at Portsmouth for refitting, but by 2 August she was in Lisbon, on her way with a small squadron for The Gambia to settle some unrest in the area. She was in the Gambia by 2 September and then sailed to join Stag and Tweed. By November Clio was on the south coast of Spain. She sailed to Tarragona in June 1836. By 18 May 1839 she was in Portsmouth.

Hydra towed Lily into Portsmouth on 23 May 1839 to be paid off. Commander Deare and almost all his officers transferred from Clio to recommission Lily. Commander Stephen Grenville Fremantle was appointed to take over Clio.

Clio sailed for South America in May 1839 and was in the Rio Plata on 13 January 1841. She spent most of the year cruising out of Montevideo and Rio de Janeiro. On 27 June she captured the slaver ship Felix Vincedor (or Feliz Vencedor); prize money was paid on 31 August 1844. On 12 May a boat under Lieutenant Cox, with 12 men captured a slaver in the Piumas Islands with 300 slaves aboard. However, some seven boats with a dozen men apiece sortied and re-captured the slaver, burning it after having landed the slaves. A week later, while Cox was taking water at Campos, some of the slavers took him and his men prisoner after wounding four seamen. Shortly thereafter the Brazilians released their British captives. At the end of September she left Simon's Bay for the East Indies. On 6 November Fremantle was promoted to Acting Captain and appointed to Southampton. Clio's new captain was Commander Edward Norwich Troubridge.

== Opium War ==
Late in 1841 Clio sailed to China for the First Opium War. On 12 December 1841 she struck a rock (Clio Rock), just west of Pak-Leak Island, near Macao.

On 13 June 1842, Clio anchored off Woosung. On 16 June, after the defences at the mouth of the river were sounded and buoyed, the British bombarded the works on both sides of the river as part of the commencement of operations against Shanghai. Clio then participated in the expedition up the Yangtze River, to the end of hostilities and signing of the Treaty of Nanking on 29 August. Troubridge's replacement as captain of Clio from 30 December 1842 was Commander James Fitzjames.

== Fate ==
Clio was broken up at Portsmouth in 1845.
