= Port Louis, Falkland Islands =

Early capital of the Falklands

Coordinates: 51°31′57.38″S 58°7′54.01″W

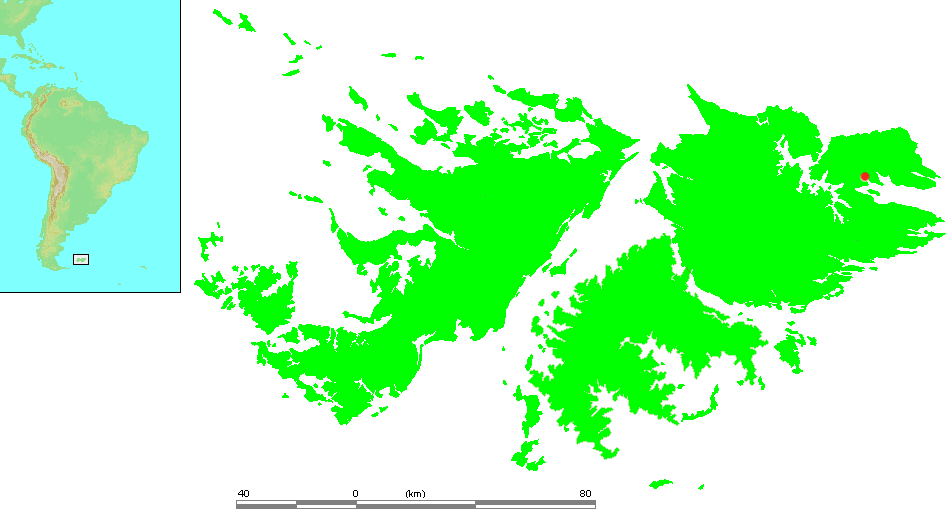
Location of Port Louis in the Falkland Islands.

Port Louis is a settlement on northeastern East Falkland. It was established by Louis de Bougainville on 5 April 1764 as the first French settlement on the islands, but was then transferred to Spain in 1767 and renamed Puerto Soledad (in Spanish, East Falkland is known as Isla Soledad).

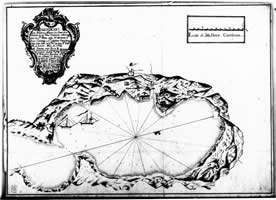
Map of Port Louis, surveyed in 1774 (West-Up map)

== History ==
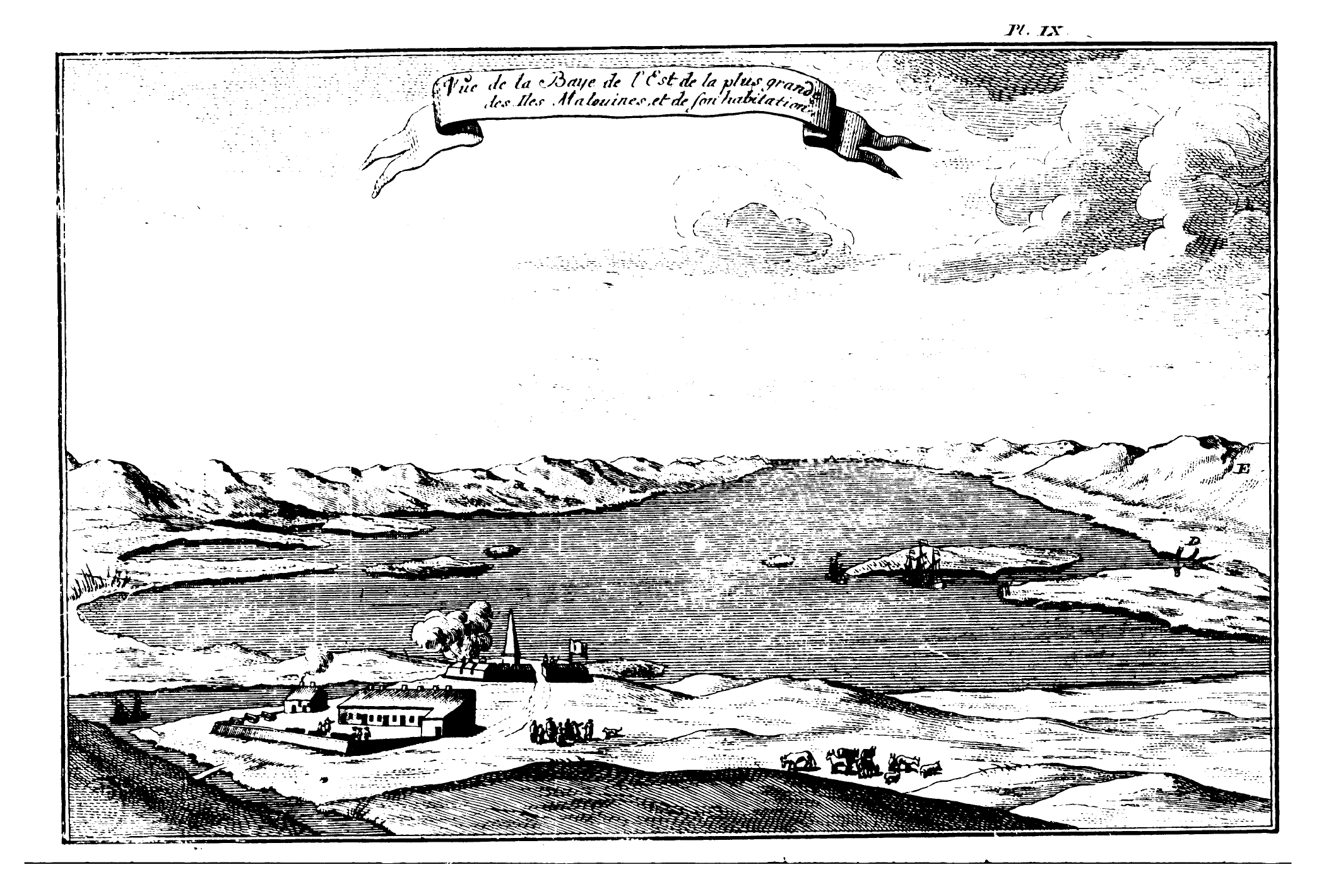
A view of the settlement in the French period

The settlement has seen several name changes. The original French settlers named the settlement Port Saint Louis, which was changed to Puerto Soledad after capture by Spain. Vernet reverted to a Spanish version of the original name when he formed his settlement, Puerto Luis. The British renamed the settlement Anson's Harbour for a while before reverting once more to the original French name, Port Louis.

For a time, the town became the Spanish capital of the islands, which were claimed by Spain and administered from Montevideo as a naval outpost (Presidio). The Spanish removed the governor in 1806 and abandoned the settlement in 1811.

In October 1820, following damage to his ship Heroína in a storm, Colonel David Jewett was forced to put into the islands to shelter in Puerto Soledad. This was the culmination of a disastrous eight-month voyage that saw a mutiny and most of his crew disabled by scurvy and other diseases. While in harbour, there was another attempt at mutiny by the crew who wished to return to Buenos Aires. With many of his crew disabled by scurvy, Jewett sought the assistance of the British Antarctic explorer James Weddell in preparing his ship for sea once more.

On 6 November 1820, Jewett raised the flag of the United Provinces of the Río de la Plata (now Argentina) at Port Louis. Weddell witnessed the ceremony.

After resting in the islands and repairing his ship, Jewett returned to Buenos Aires.

=== Luis Vernet ===
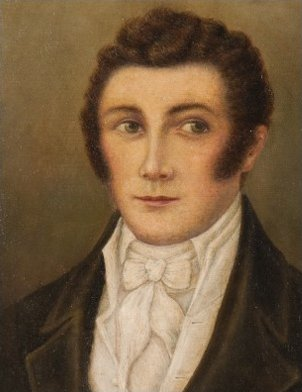
Luis Vernet.

In 1823, the United Provinces of the River Plate granted fishing rights to Jorge Pacheco and the Hamburg-born merchant Luis Vernet. The partnership of Pacheco and Vernet did not last, with Vernet forming a new company in 1825. An expedition in 1826 proved to be a failure; sailings to the Islands were disrupted by a Brazilian blockade and the boggy terrain of the Islands prevented the Gauchos catching wild cattle in their traditional way.

In 1828, the United Provinces of the River Plate granted Vernet all of East Falkland together with exclusive fishing and sealing rights. Included in the grant was a clause that provided a colony was established within three years, it would be exempt from taxes. Settling in the former Spanish capital of Puerto Soledad, Vernet reverted to the use of its original name Puerto Luis. By 1831, the colony was well established and advertising for new colonists, although the Lexington's report (see below) suggests that the conditions on the islands were quite miserable.

The colony was largely archaic, and the Argentine government hoped that Vernet's appointment would bolster the economic and political status of the colony, given his extensive business operations. Vernet was well aware of British claims to the islands. Prior to both the 1826 and 1828 expeditions, he approached the British consulate with the grant of the United Provinces of the River Plate and obtained their stamp. While visiting the consulate, he expressed the wish that if the British returned they would take his colony under their protection. Vernet also provided written reports on the suitability of the Islands for the British Government.

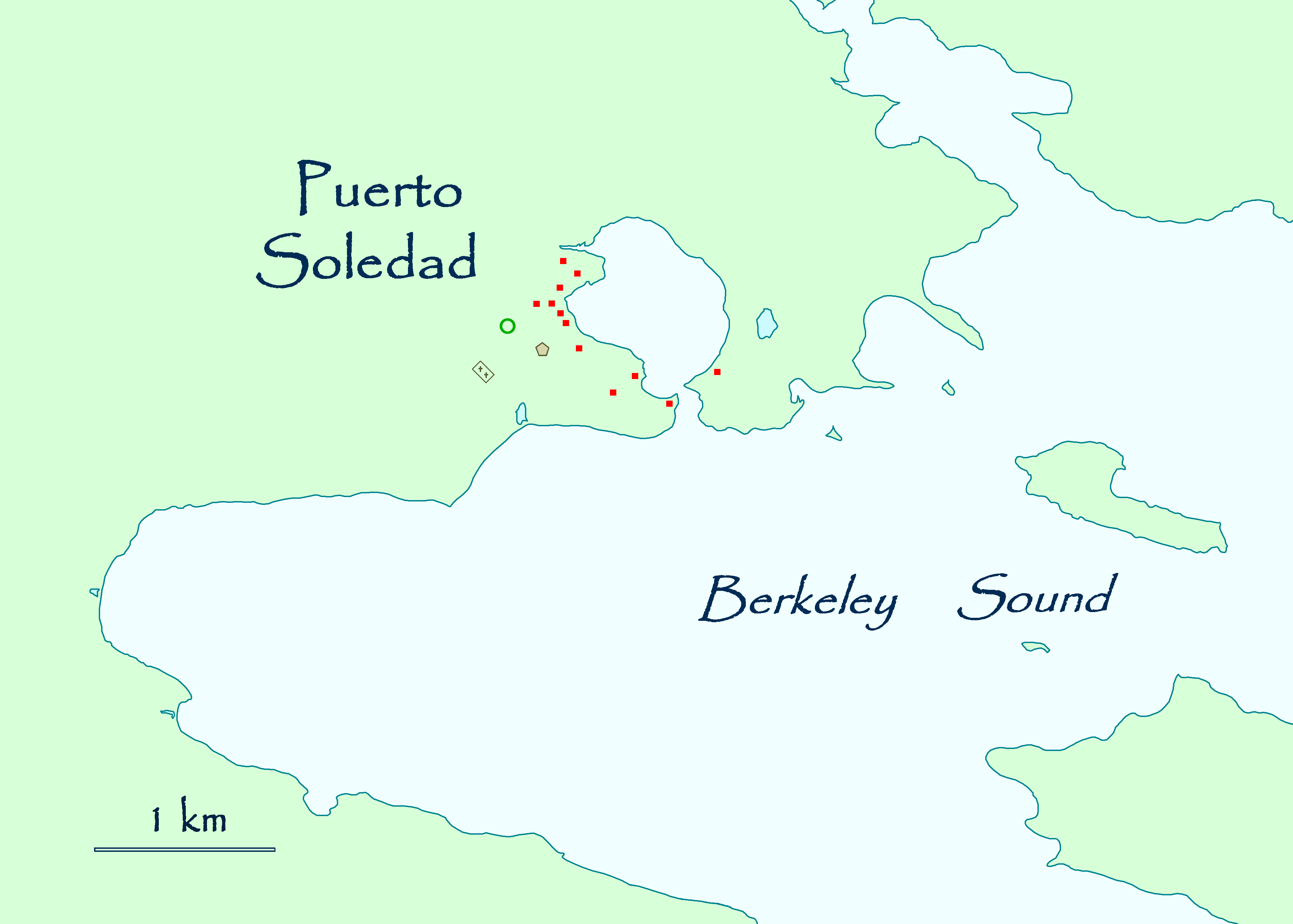
The settlement as Puerto Soledad.

Vernet used Puerto Soledad/Puerto Luis as a seal hunting base. The United Provinces of the River Plate granted him a monopoly in the islands and he curbed sealing by others. Vernet later seized the American ship Harriet for breaking the restrictions on seal hunting. Property on board the ship was seized and the captain was returned to Buenos Aires to stand trial. Vernet also returned for the trial. The American Consul in the United Provinces of the River Plate protested the actions by Vernet, stating that the United States did not recognise its sovereignty in the Falklands.

The consul dispatched the warship USS Lexington to Puerto Luis to retake the confiscated property, as well as the Superior and Breakwater which had also been seized. The Lexington destroyed the guns and powder of Puerto Luis in 1832, an act later condoned by the American ambassador in Buenos Aires, who declared the Falkland Islands to be res nullius ("free from any power"). 40 settlers took the opportunity to leave on board the Lexington, leaving twenty-four behind.

=== Re-establishment of British rule on the Falklands ===
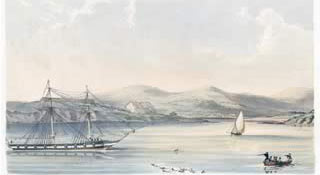
A view of the harbour of Port Louis, East Falklands by AR Grieve

Amid the turmoil, the British took over the settlement in 1833. In March/April that year, Charles Darwin visited from HMS Beagle. He commented that:

After the possession of these miserable islands had been contested by France, Spain, and England, they were left uninhabited. The government of Buenos Aires then sold them to a private individual, but likewise used them, as old Spain had done before, for a penal settlement. England claimed her right and seized them. The Englishman who was left in charge of the flag was consequently murdered. A British officer was next sent, unsupported by any power: and when we arrived, we found him in charge of a population, of which rather more than half were runaway rebels and murderers.

— The Voyage of the Beagle

Admiral George Grey conducted a survey of the islands in 1836, and his view was a little more positive. In November 1846 he wrote:

Today the weather was beautiful and Port Louis or Solidad [sic] seen to advantage as soon as I had finished my breakfast I landed in company with the Governor to inspect the state of his little Colony, which is situated overlooking a small basin or inner harbour, the principal house of which is that inhabited by Lieut. Smith and among the miserable huts by which it is surrounded looks respectable by comparison, it is white-washed, has a flag staff before it and looks like a preventative station on the coast of Northumberland.

After they transferred the administration to Stanley in 1845, it became the quiet sheep farming settlement it is today, known for its nineteenth-century houses, waterfowl and wading birds.

== See also ==
- Origins of Falkland Islanders
- Puerto Soledad
- Re-establishment of British rule on the Falklands (1833)
