= Duncan =

Duncan may refer to:

== People ==
- Duncan (given name), various people
- Duncan (surname), various people
- Clan Duncan
- Justice Duncan (disambiguation)

== Places ==
- Duncan Creek (disambiguation)
- Duncan River (disambiguation)
- Duncan Lake (disambiguation), including Lake Duncan

=== Australia ===
- Duncan, South Australia, a locality in the Kangaroo Island Council
- Hundred of Duncan, a cadastral unit on Kangaroo Island in South Australia

=== Bahamas ===
- Duncan Town, Ragged Island, Bahamas
  - Duncan Town Airport

=== Canada ===
- Duncan, British Columbia, on Vancouver Island
- Duncan Dam, British Columbia
- Duncan City, Central Kootenay, British Columbia; see List of ghost towns in British Columbia
- Mount Duncan, in the Selkirk Mountains

=== United States ===
- Duncan Township (disambiguation)
- Duncan, Arizona
- Duncan, Iowa
- Duncan, Kentucky (disambiguation)
- Duncan City, Cheboygan, Michigan
- Duncan, Mississippi
- Duncan, Missouri
- Duncan, Nebraska
- Duncan, North Carolina
- Duncan, Oklahoma
- Duncan, South Carolina
- Fort Duncan, Eagle Pass, Texas

== Brands and enterprises ==
- Duncan (mango), a named mango variety selected and patented in Florida
- Duncan Toys Company, manufacturer of yo-yos and other toys
- Seymour Duncan, a manufacturer of guitar pickups and effects pedals

== Music ==
- "Duncan" (Paul Simon song)
- "Duncan" (Slim Dusty song)
- "Duncan", a song by Sarah Slean on the album Night Bugs

== Ships ==
- HMS Duncan (multiple)
- USS Duncan (multiple)

== Other uses ==
- Duncan (horse)

== See also ==
- Duncanville (disambiguation)
- Dunkin (disambiguation)
