= Dunkin (surname) =

Dunkin is a surname. Notable people with the surname include:

- Christopher Dunkin, PC (1812–1881), Canadian editor, lawyer, teacher, judge, and politician
- Edwin Dunkin FRS, (1821–1898), British astronomer
- Kenneth Dunkin, (born 1966), Democratic member of the Illinois House of Representatives
- Robert Dunkin (1761–1831), mentor of the young Humphry Davy
- Tony Dunkin (born 1970), American basketball player
- William Dunkin (1709–1765), Irish poet

== See also ==
- Duncan (disambiguation)
- Dunkin (disambiguation)
