= Melancthon Woolsey =

Melancthon Woolsey may refer to:

- Melancthon Brooks Woolsey (1817–1874), United States Navy officer
- Melancthon Taylor Woolsey (1782–1838), United States Navy officer
