= Dunklin =

Dunklin may refer to:

- Dunklin County, Missouri, United States
- Daniel Dunklin (1790–1844), American politician
- James Dunklin House, a historic home in South Carolina, United States

== See also ==
- Dunkin (disambiguation)
