= Brazil Squadron =

Military unit of the United States Navy

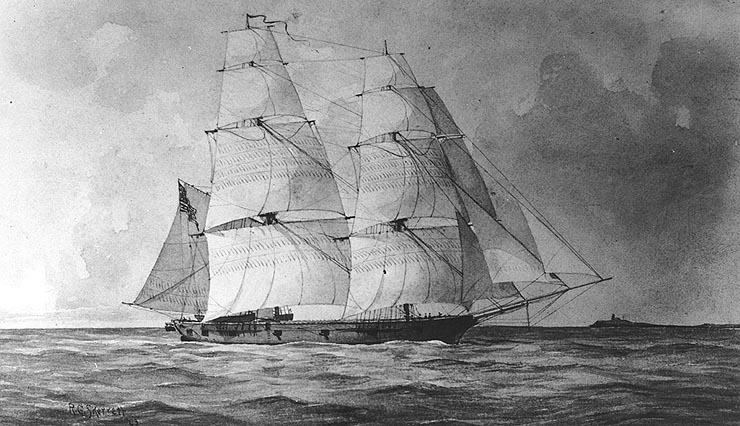
- A wash painting of the brig USS Bainbridge.
- Active: 1826–1905
- Country: United States of America
- Branch: United States Navy
- Type: Naval squadron

The Brazil Squadron, the Brazil Station, or the South Atlantic Squadron was an overseas military station established by the United States in 1826 to protect American commerce in the South Atlantic during a war between Brazil and Argentina. When the Cisplatine War between Argentina and Brazil ended, the station remained and continued to protect American interests during several other conflicts. The squadron was also active in the Blockade of Africa suppressing the Atlantic slave trade. Under French Chadwick, the South Atlantic Squadron was involved in the 1904 Perdicaris Incident in Tangier, Morocco. It ceased to exist when it was absorbed into the North Atlantic Fleet in 1905.

== Falklands Expedition ==
An expedition to the Falkland Islands was launched in late 1831 when the sloop-of-war USS Lexington was sent to Puerto Soledad to investigate the capture and possible armament of two American whalers. When the sailors arrived at the settlement, its Argentine population was found to be suffering from starvation so Commander Silas Duncan evacuated the colonists to the mainland. Because of this the Falklands were left unpopulated and open for British colonization a few years later. Argentina's dispute with the United Kingdom over rights to the islands culminated in the 1982 Falklands War which left the British in control. Argentine accounts claim that the USS Lexington destroyed the town with naval gunfire, while American accounts differ.

== Slave trade ==
Slave trading vessels captured by Brazil Squadron
Vessel	Captor	Date	Location
Porpoise	Raritan	23 January 1845	Rio de Janeiro
Albert	Bainbridge	June 1845	Bahia
Laurens	Onkahye	23 January 1848	Rio de Janeiro
A.D. Richardson	Perry	11 December 1848	Rio de Janeiro
Independence	Perry	13 December 1848	Rio de Janeiro
Susan	Perry	6 February 1849	Rio de Janeiro

== Commanders ==
=== Brazil Squadron ===
- Commodore Jesse D. Elliott 1825-1826
- Commodore James Biddle 1826-1828
- Commodore John Orde Creighton 1828-1829
- Commodore Stephen Cassin 1829-1831
- Commodore George W. Rodgers 1830–1832
- Commodore Melancthon Taylor Woolsey 1832-1834
- Commodore Daniel Turner 1834-1835
- Commodore James Renshaw 1835-1837
- Commodore John B. Nicolson 1838-1840
- Commodore Charles G. Ridgely 1840–1842
- Commodore Charles Morris 16 Dec 1841 - 19 Feb 1843
- Commodore Edward Rutledge Shubrick 14 Dec 1842- 27 Jun 1843
- Commodore Charles W. Morgan 3 May 1843 - 7 Aug 1843
- Commodore Daniel Turner 18 Apr 1844 – 28 Apr 1845
- Commodore Lawrence Rousseau 25 Oct 1845 – 11 Oct 1847
- Commodore George W. Storer 22 Nov 1847 – 26 Dec 1850
- Commodore Silas H. Stringham 26 Dec 1850 - 1851
- Commodore Isaac McKeever 1 Jun 1851 – 20 Jul 1853
- Commodore William D. Salter 19 Feb 1853 - 22 Apr 1856
- Captain Samuel Mercer 24 Apr 1856 - 3 Dec 1856 (acting)
- Commodore French Forrest 8 Oct 1856 - 8 May 1858
- Commodore William B. Shubrick 9 Sep 1858 - 16 May 1859
- Commodore Joshua R. Sands 7 Jul 1859 - 24 Aug 1860
- Commodore Louis M. Goldsborough 1860 - 12 Apr 1861

=== Special Squadron ===
- Rear Admiral Sylvanus Godon (12 Apr 1865-12 Jun 1865)

=== South Atlantic Squadron ===
- Rear Admiral William Radford (12 Aug 1865-15 Oct 1865)
- Rear Admiral Sylvanus Godon (Oct 1865-Dec 1866)
- Rear Admiral Charles H. Davis (17 Jun 1867-22 Jul 1869)
- Commodore Melancthon Brooks Woolsey (23 Jul 1869-21 Dec 1869) acting
- Rear Admiral Joseph Lanman (3 Sep 1869-27 Jun 1872)
- Rear Admiral Melancthon Brooks Woolsey (27 Jun 1872-31 Oct 1873)
- Rear Admiral James Hooker Strong (4 Nov 1873-27 Jul 1874)
- Rear Admiral William E. Le Roy (22 Jul 1874-11 Jan 1876)
- Commodore Charles Henry Bromedge Caldwell (20 Oct 1876-18 Sep 1877)
- Rear Admiral Edward T. Nichols (28 Feb 1878-16 Nov 1879)
- Rear Admiral Andrew Bryson (10 Oct 1879-25 Jul 1881)
- Rear Admiral James H. Spotts (25 Jul 1881-21 Feb 1882)
- Captain Aaron W. Weaver (13 Mar 1882-7 Jun 1882) acting
- Rear Admiral Peirce Crosby (9 Jun 1882-31 Jan 1883)
- Captain Aaron W. Weaver (3 Feb 1883-2 Jun 1883) acting
- Rear Admiral Thomas S. Phelps (5 Jun 1883-20 Oct 1884)
- (1884-1885)
- Rear Admiral Daniel L. Braine (12 Aug 1886-1888)
- Rear Admiral James Henry Gillis (1888-1890)
- Rear Admiral John G. Walker (1890-1892)
- Rear Admiral Andrew E. K. Benham (5 Jun 1892-May 1893)
- Rear Admiral Oscar F. Stanton (Jul 1893-Apr 1894)
- Rear Admiral William A. Kirkland (Apr 1894-Aug 1894)
- Rear Admiral Bancroft Gherardi (Aug 1894-1895)
- Rear Admiral Charles S. Norton (Jan 1895-May 1897)
- Captain Yates Stirling (Jul 1897-Dec 1897) (acting)
- Captain Colby M. Chester (Dec 1897-Mar 1898) (acting)
- Rear Admiral Henry L. Howison (30 Mar 1899-2 Oct 1899)
- Rear Admiral Winfield S. Schley (Nov 1899-9 Oct 1901)
- Rear Admiral George W. Sumner (5 Feb 1902-10 Oct 1903)
- Rear Admiral Benjamin P. Lamberton (11 Oct 1903-1904)
- Captain Richard Wainwright (1 Feb 1904-1904) (acting)
- Rear Admiral French E. Chadwick (1904-1904)
- Rear Admiral Charles D. Sigsbee (1904-1905)

== See also ==
- Charles G. Ridgely
