= Duncan Creek =

Duncan Creek may refer to:

- Duncan Creek (Crooked Creek tributary), a stream in Missouri
- Duncan Creek (Little Osage River tributary), a stream in Missouri
- Duncan Creek (Gasconade River tributary), a stream in Missouri
- Duncan Creek (California), a tributary of Pinole Creek
- Duncan Creek (Idaho), a National Wild and Scenic River
- Duncan Creek (South Carolina), traversed by South Carolina Highway 391

== See also ==
- Duncan Lake (disambiguation)
- Duncan River (disambiguation)
