= USS Duncan =

Three ships of the United States Navy have been named USS Duncan, in honor of Master Commandant Silas Duncan.

- USS Duncan (DD-46) was a Cassin-class destroyer launched in 1913.
- USS Duncan (DD-485) was a Gleaves-class destroyer launched in February 1942 and sunk at the Battle of Cape Esperance in October 1942.
- USS Duncan (DD-874) was a Gearing-class destroyer launched in 1944.

A fourth ship named has been named USS Duncan, in honor of Vice Admiral Donald B. Duncan (1896–1975).

- USS Duncan (FFG-10) was an Oliver Hazard Perry-class frigate commissioned in 1980 and decommissioned in 1994

== See also ==
- HMS Duncan
