= Eric Duncan =

Eric Duncan may refer to:

- Thomas Eric Duncan (1972–2014), Liberian Ebola patient diagnosed un US
- Eric Duncan (baseball) (born 1984), American baseball coach
- Eric Duncan (politician) (born 1987), Canadian politician in Ontario

== See also ==
- Duncan (disambiguation)
