= Duncan Lake =

Duncan Lake or Lake Duncan or variation, may refer to:

== Places ==
=== Lakes ===
A lake, one of many lakes around the world.

==== Canada ====
One of several lakes in Canada:

- Duncan Lake (British Columbia) in British Columbia. Four lakes by this name.
- Duncan Lake (Manitoba) in Manitoba
- Duncan Lake (Northwest Territories) in the Northwest Territories
- Duncan Lake (Ontario) in Ontario. Natural Resources Canada website lists seven lakes in the province.
- Duncan Lake (Quebec) in Quebec
- Duncan Lake (Saskatchewan) in Saskatchewan. Two lakes by this name.

==== United States ====
One of several lakes in the United States:

- Lake Duncan (Oklahoma), a reservoir for Duncan City, Oklahoma; near Fuqua Lake
- Duncan Lake (Michigan)
- Duncan Lake (Minnesota)
- Duncan Lake (Montana)
- Duncan Lake (New Hampshire)
- Duncan Lake (Tennessee)
- Duncan Lake (Texas)
- Duncan Lake (Wyoming)

=== Other places ===
Places that are not lakes:

- Duncan Lake 1, British Columbia, and Indian Reserve in British Columbia

== Other uses ==
- Lake Duncan, a Design 1020 ship WWI U.S. emergency-war-lift cargo ship

== See also ==
- Duncan Creek (disambiguation)
- Duncan River (disambiguation)
- Duncan (disambiguation)
- Lake (disambiguation)
