= USS Duncan (DD-874) =

Gearing-class destroyer

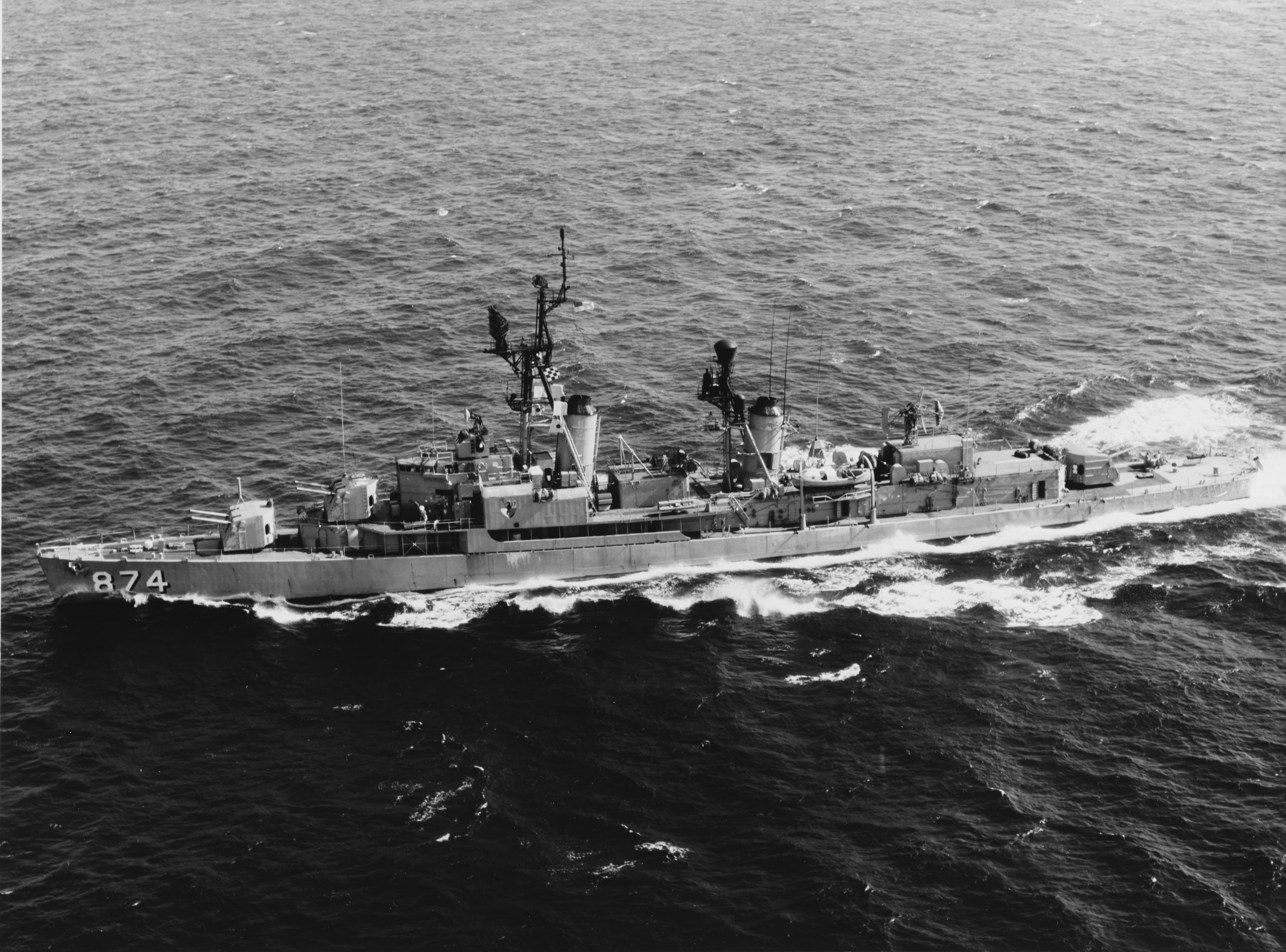
- USS Duncan underway, 1960's

History

United States
- Name: USS Duncan
- Namesake: Silas Duncan
- Builder: Consolidated Steel Corporation, Orange, Texas
- Laid down: 22 May 1944
- Launched: 27 October 1944
- Commissioned: 25 February 1945
- Decommissioned: 15 January 1971
- Reclassified: DDR-874, 18 March 1949
- Stricken: 1 February 1974
- Identification: Callsign: NBHI; Hull number: DD-874
- Honors and awards: 7 battle stars (Korea)
- Fate: Sunk as target, 31 July 1980

General characteristics
- Class & type: Gearing-class destroyer
- Displacement: 2,425 long tons (2,464 t)
- Length: 390 ft 6 in (119.02 m)
- Beam: 40 ft 1 in (12.22 m)
- Draft: 18 ft 6 in (5.64 m)
- Propulsion: Geared turbines, 2 shafts, 60,000 shp (45 MW)
- Speed: 36.8 knots (68.2 km/h; 42.3 mph)
- Range: 4,500 nmi (8,300 km) at 20 kn (37 km/h; 23 mph)
- Complement: 336
- Armament: 6 × 5-inch/38-caliber guns

USS Duncan (DD-874) was a Gearing-class destroyer of the United States Navy, the third named for Captain Silas Duncan USN (1788–1834). The ship was laid down by the Consolidated Steel Corporation at Orange, Texas on 22 May 1944, launched on 27 October 1944 by Mrs. D. C. Thayer and commissioned on 25 February 1945. The ship was sunk in 1980.

== Service history ==
Duncan, converted to a radar picket destroyer during her post-shakedown overhaul, sailed from Norfolk on 2 June 1945 for the Pacific, and after touching down at San Diego and Pearl Harbor, joined Cabot (CVL-28) for screening and plane guard duty during the strikes on Wake Island of 1 August. After calling at Eniwetok, she continued to Okinawa to join the 7th Fleet for patrol duty off the Chinese and Korean coasts during the landing of occupation troops at Tsingtao, Taku, and Incheon. Duncan served in the Far East on occupation duty until 25 March 1946 when she sailed for the west coast, arriving at San Diego on 28 April.

For the next year Duncan trained along the west coast, keeping high her operational skills and readiness. In May 1947 she departed San Diego for a five-month cruise to the Far East, where she visited Okinawa, Japan, and China. On her return to the States, Duncan resumed coastal operations with both aircraft and submarines. On 1 March 1948 she suffered 2 killed and 14 injured in an explosion on board. She "suffered considerable damage at the stern and the flooding of the after compartment from a hole at the water line." After repairs at Long Beach, California, the destroyer rejoined the fleet for training until January 1949, when she again sailed for the western Pacific, this time for eight months. Duncan was reclassified DDR-874 on 18 March 1949.

Duncan operated between San Diego and Pearl Harbor until November 1950 when she steamed into Korean waters to join the 7th Fleet. Duncan served a total of three tours off Korea during the fighting. She sailed as plane guard for carriers and as anti-submarine escort for battleships; she fired shore bombardments in support of minesweepers and to interdict enemy communications; she patrolled against North Korean minesweepers and fishing craft. Through all she added her significant contribution to the vast sea-borne support of the United Nations troops ashore.

After the end of the Korean fighting in 1953, Duncan remained busy in the Pacific, alternating Far Eastern duty with training and maintenance on the west coast. She visited Australia, Japan, the Philippines, Taiwan, Hong Kong, and many islands of the Pacific. During 1960–1961 Duncan entered the FRAM program, and underwent extensive overhaul and modernization at Long Beach Naval Shipyard.

During the Vietnam War Duncan served as plane guard for aircraft carriers on "Yankee Station" in the Gulf of Tonkin, participated in Operations "Sea Dragon" and "Market Time", patrolled on search and rescue duties, and carried out naval gunfire support missions.

Duncan was decommissioned on 15 January 1971, struck from the Naval Vessel Register on 1 February 1974, and sunk as a target off California on 31 July 1980. 31°00′00.7″N 120°00′00.3″W

== Awards ==
Duncan received seven battle stars for Korean War service.
