= USS Duncan (DD-46) =

Cassin-class destroyer

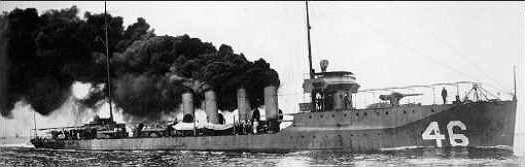
- USS Duncan (DD-46) making dense smoke on speed trials 5 July 1913.

History

United States
- Name: Duncan
- Namesake: Commander Silas Duncan
- Builder: Fore River Shipbuilding Company, Quincy, Massachusetts
- Cost: $794,277.06
- Laid down: 17 June 1912
- Launched: 5 April 1913
- Sponsored by: Miss D. Clark
- Commissioned: 30 August 1913
- Decommissioned: 1 August 1922
- Stricken: 8 March 1935
- Identification: Hull symbol:DD-46; Code letters:NIR
- Fate: Sold for scrapping, 1935

General characteristics
- Class & type: Cassin-class destroyer
- Displacement: 1,014 long tons (1,030 t)
- Length: 305 ft 3 in (93.04 m)
- Beam: 31 ft 2 in (9.50 m)
- Draft: 9 ft 3 in (2.82 m) (mean)
- Installed power: oil fired boilers; 16,000 ihp (12,000 kW)
- Propulsion: 2 × Direct Drive Turbines With Triple Expansion Cruising Engines; 2 × shafts
- Speed: 29.5 kn (33.9 mph; 54.6 km/h); 29.14 kn (33.53 mph; 53.97 km/h) (Speed on Trial)
- Complement: 5 officers 98 enlisted
- Armament: 4 × 4 in (100 mm)/50 caliber guns; 8 × 18 inch (450 mm) torpedo tubes (4 × 2)

The first USS Duncan (DD-46) was a Cassin-class destroyer in the United States Navy during World War I. She was named for Commander Silas Duncan.

Duncan was launched on 5 April 1913 by Fore River Shipbuilding Company, Quincy, Massachusetts; sponsored by Miss D. Clark; and commissioned on 30 August 1913.

== World War I ==
Duncan sailed along the East Coast and in the Caribbean for training, target practice, and exercises until 24 October 1914, when she was placed out of commission at Boston, Massachusetts. Recommissioned on 22 January 1916, she sailed out of Hampton Roads and Newport, Rhode Island for Neutrality Patrol and exercises in the Caribbean, protecting battleships in fleet maneuvers, and guarding the entrance to the York River. From 8–30 September 1917, she escorted a convoy to an eastern rendezvous, where an escort out of England met the ships.

Sailing for New York on 30 October, Duncan escorted a convoy to Brest, France, arriving at Queenstown, Ireland, on 15 November to escort convoys and hunt submarines in the Irish Sea. On 17 July 1918, Duncan rescued from a small boat the survivors of the Norwegian bark Miefield and on 9 October, when one of her sisters, Shaw collided with RMS Aquitania, Duncan took off 84 of her crew, 12 of them wounded, and stood by while Shaw's remaining men took their ship into the Isle of Portland, England, under her own power.

== Inter-war period ==
Remaining in European waters after the war, Duncan joined in escorting George Washington, bearing President Woodrow Wilson, into Brest on 13 December. She cleared Queenstown on 26 December for the Azores, Bermuda, and Norfolk, Virginia, arriving on 12 January 1919.

After five months of East Coast and Caribbean operations, she was placed in ordinary at Norfolk on 31 May; in reduced commission on 1 January 1920; in reserve on 1 August; assigned to operate with 50% of her complement on 1 January 1921; and decommissioned on 9 August. She was scrapped on 8 March 1935 in accordance with the terms of the London Naval Treaty.
