= James E. Purdy =

American photographer (1858–1933)

James Edward Purdy
- Born: December 19, 1858; Saco, Maine, U.S.
- Died: August 2, 1933 (aged 74)
- Occupation: Photographer
- Years active: 1896–1933
- Organization: J. E. Purdy and Co.
- Children: 1

James Edward Purdy (December 19, 1858 – August 2, 1933) was an American photographer based in Boston, Massachusetts.

== Early life ==
Purdy was born in Saco, Maine on December 19, 1858.

== Career ==
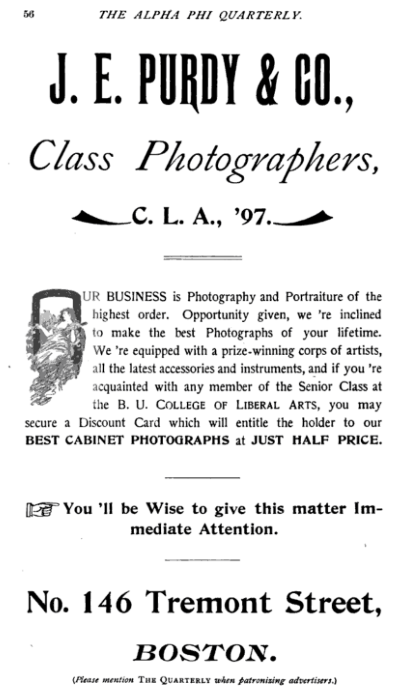
1896 Boston ad

He began his professional photography career in Wakefield, Massachusetts. In 1896, he opened his studio at 146 Tremont Street, Boston, with a partner named C. H. Howard. They decided that the business should focus on sales of celebrity photographs to newspapers and magazines, and in accordance, they specialized in making prints, working with silver bromide, carbon, and platinum papers to vary the tone.

In addition, the studio, J. E. Purdy and Co., was the leading photograph provider for Boston-area high schools for much of the 20th century.

Purdy was described by one cultural critic as one of the major "legitimate" photographers in the United States, "The famous Boston photographic artist, who has undoubtedly taken more portraits of really distinguished statesmen, authors, educators, artists, clergymen, diplomats, journalists and persons eminent in various professions than any photographer in New England."

Purdy's son, Stanley Blanchard Purdy (died 1966) joined the business in 1908.

== Death ==
Purdy died on August 2, 1933.

His son eventually took over the studio after his father's death.

== Gallery ==
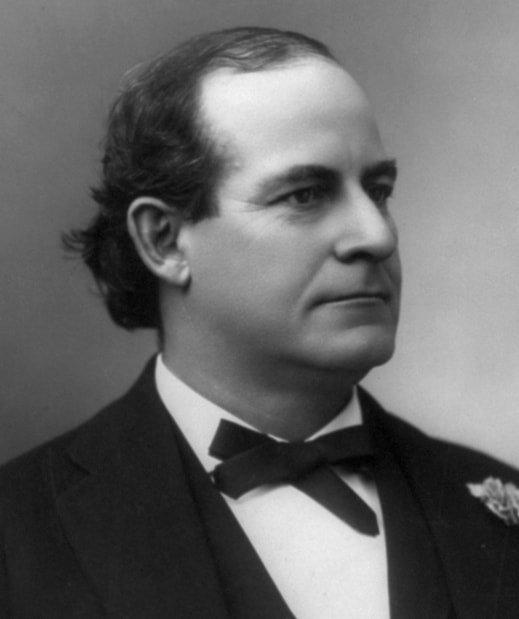
William Jennings Bryan

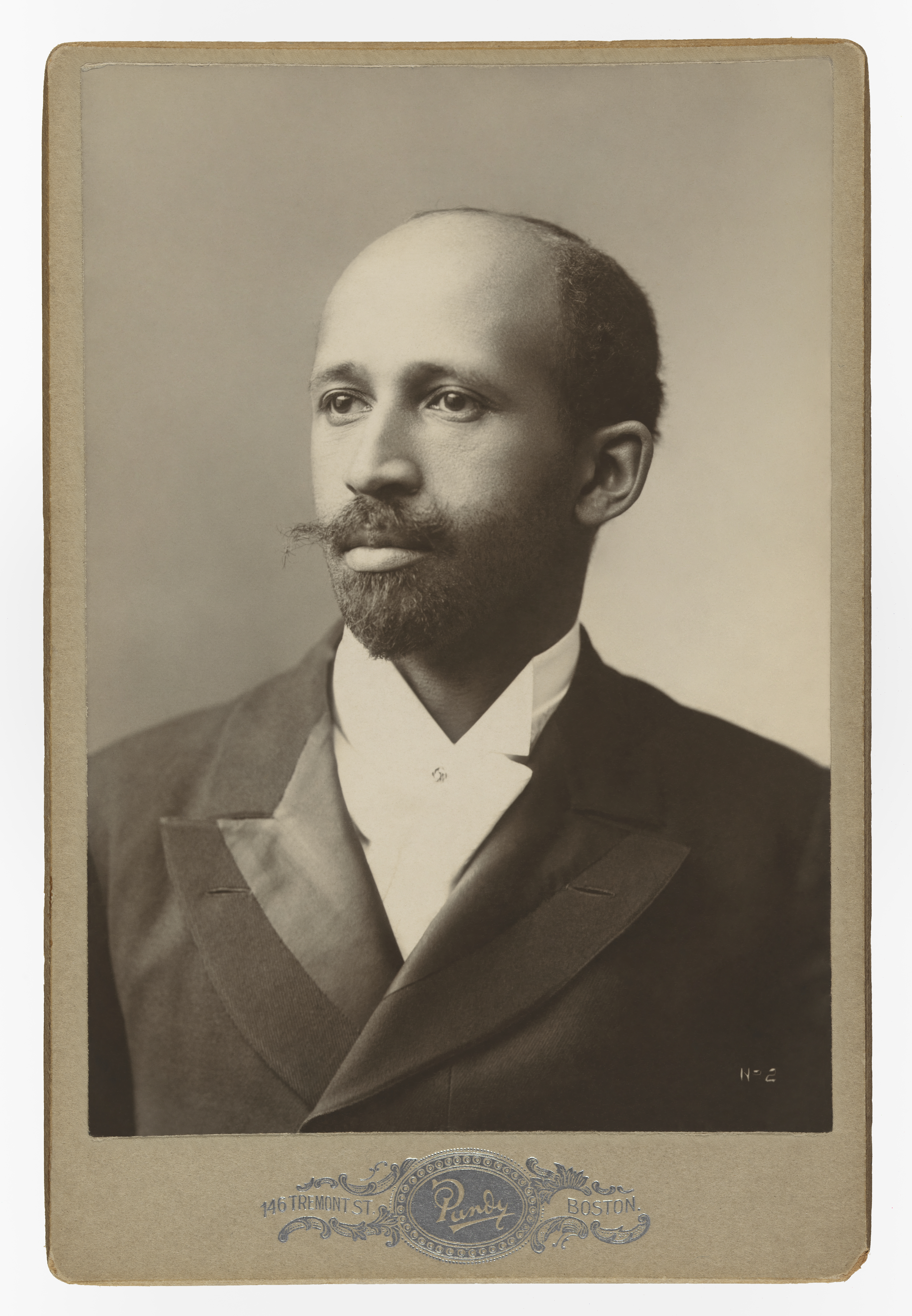
Carte-de-visite of W. E. B. Du Bois

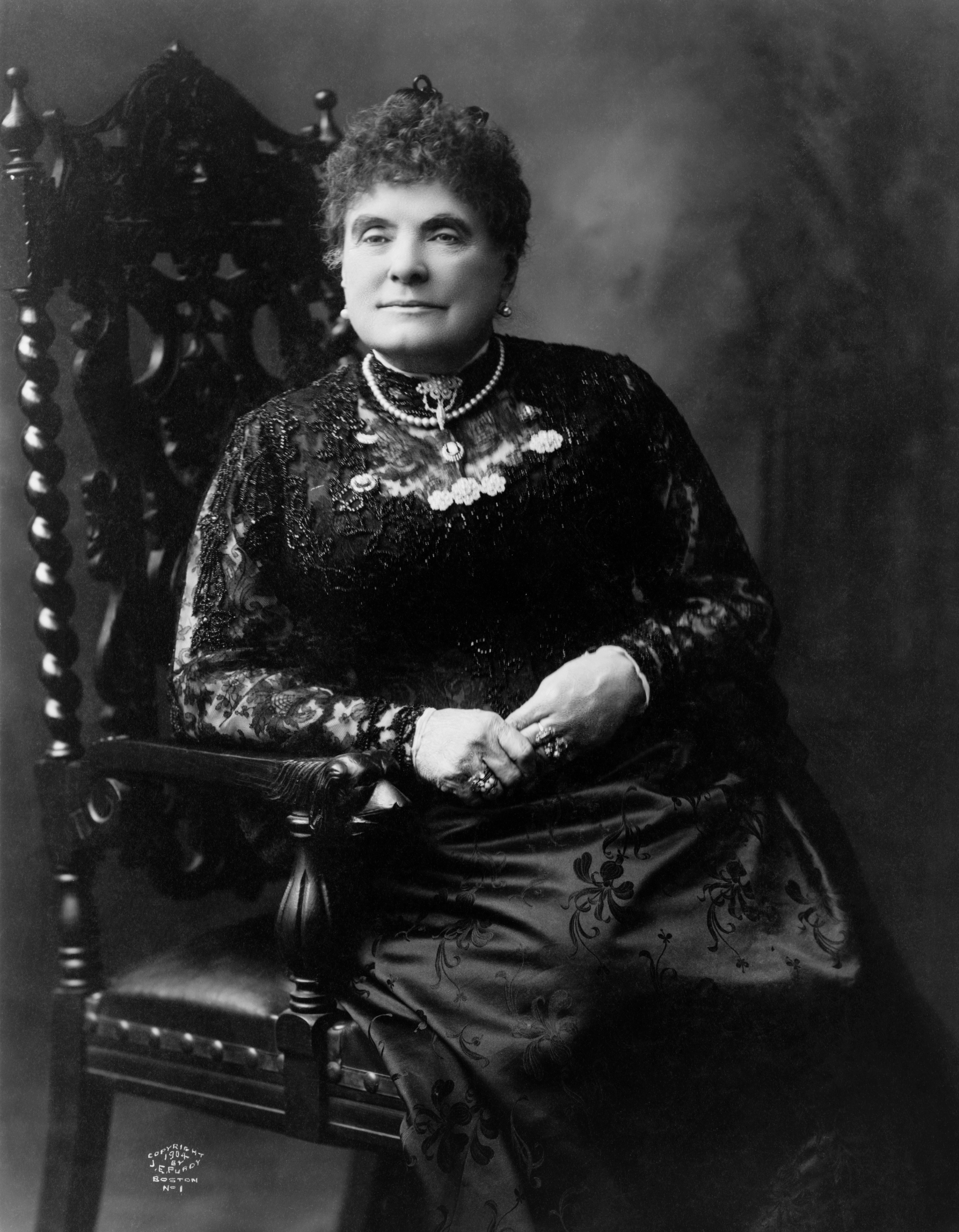
Louise Chandler Moulton

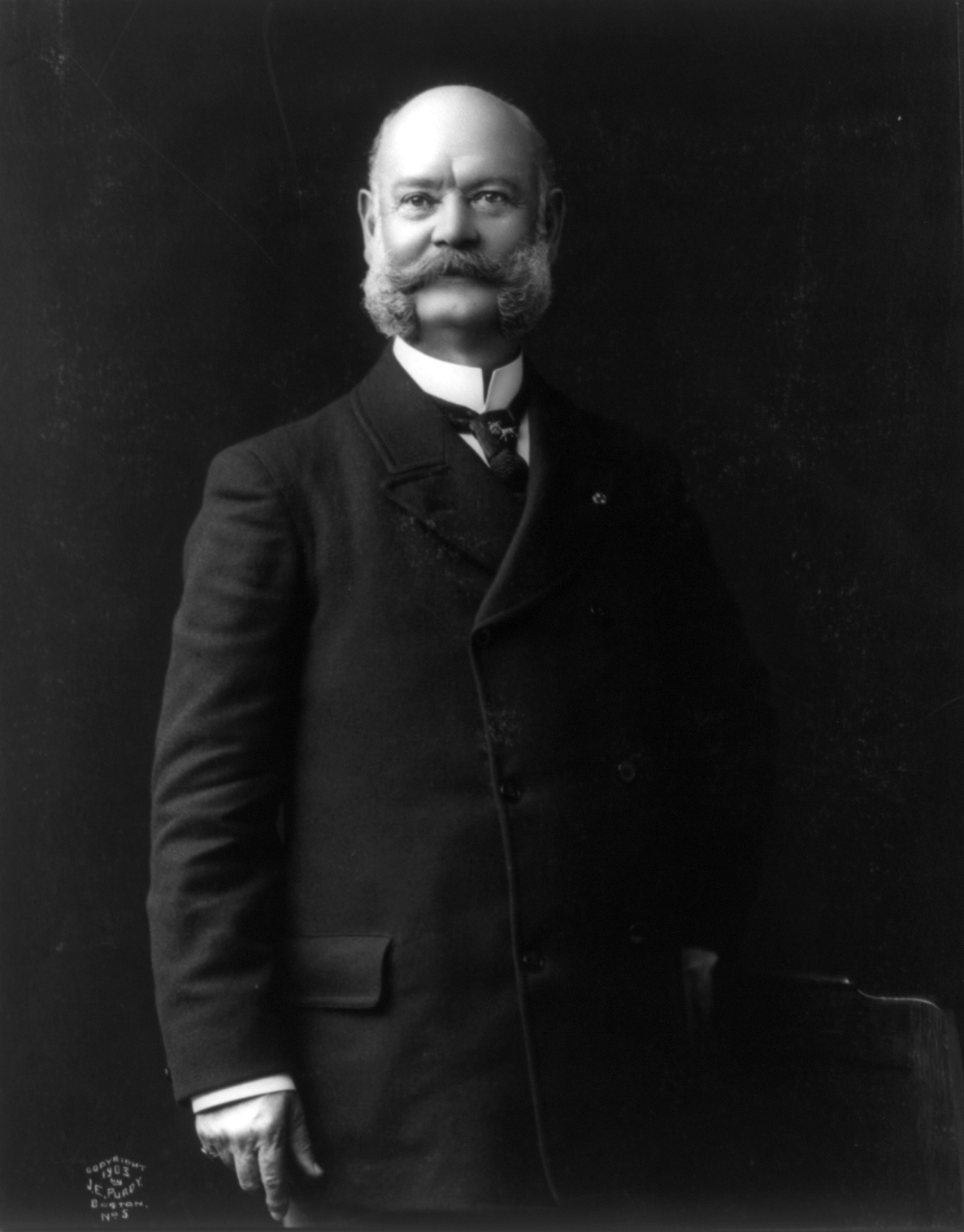
Benjamin P. Lamberton

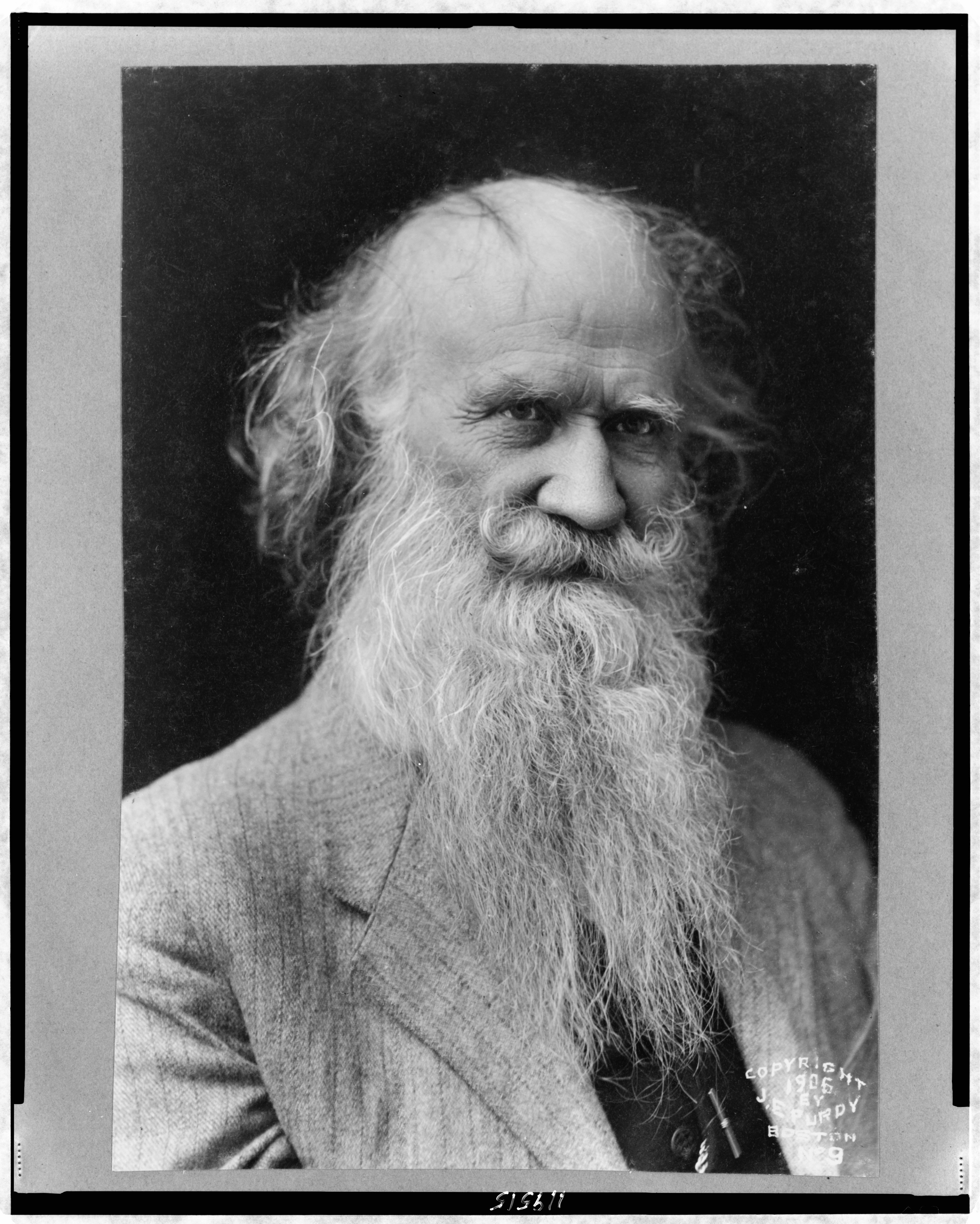
Joaquin Miller

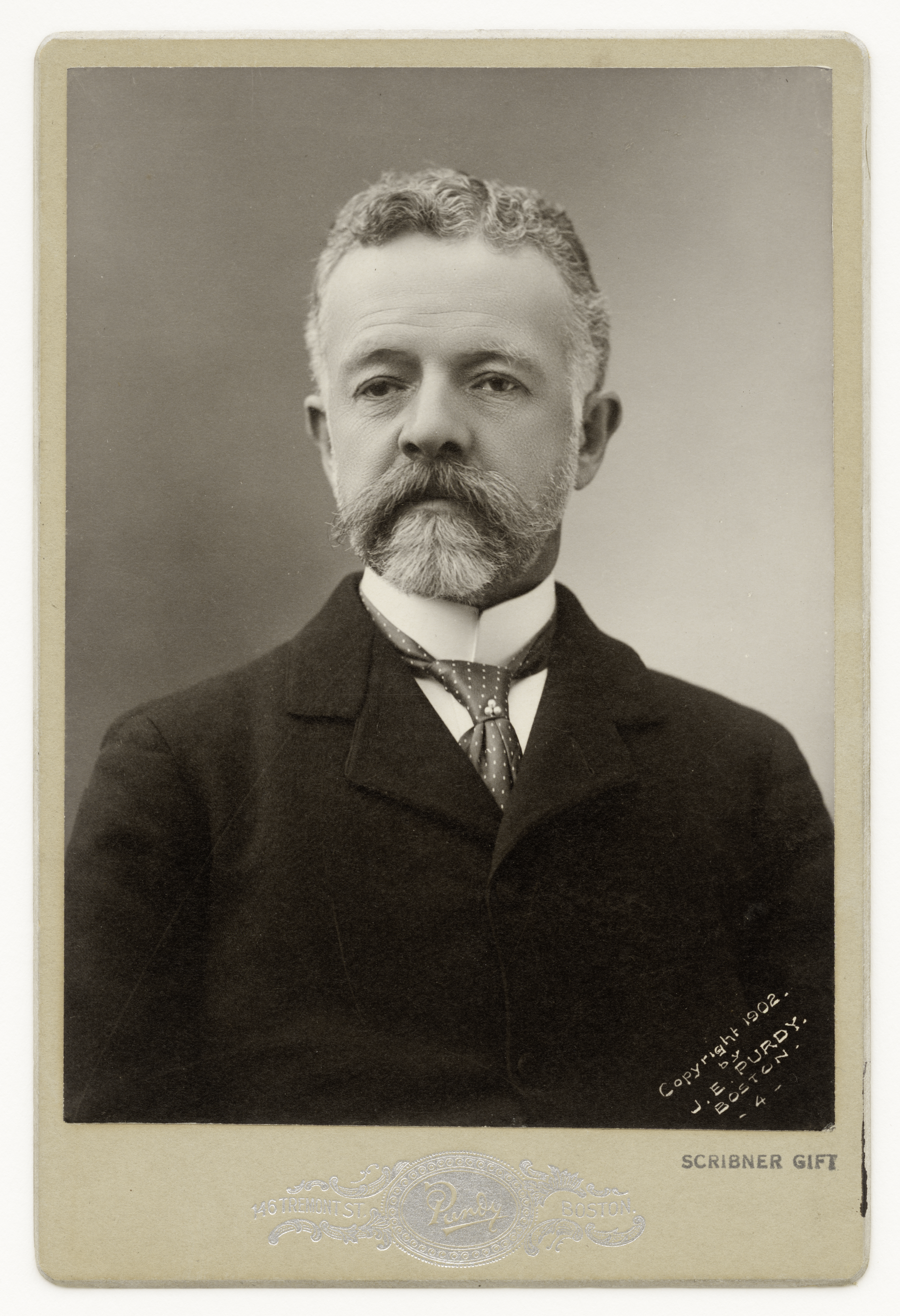
Henry Cabot Lodge

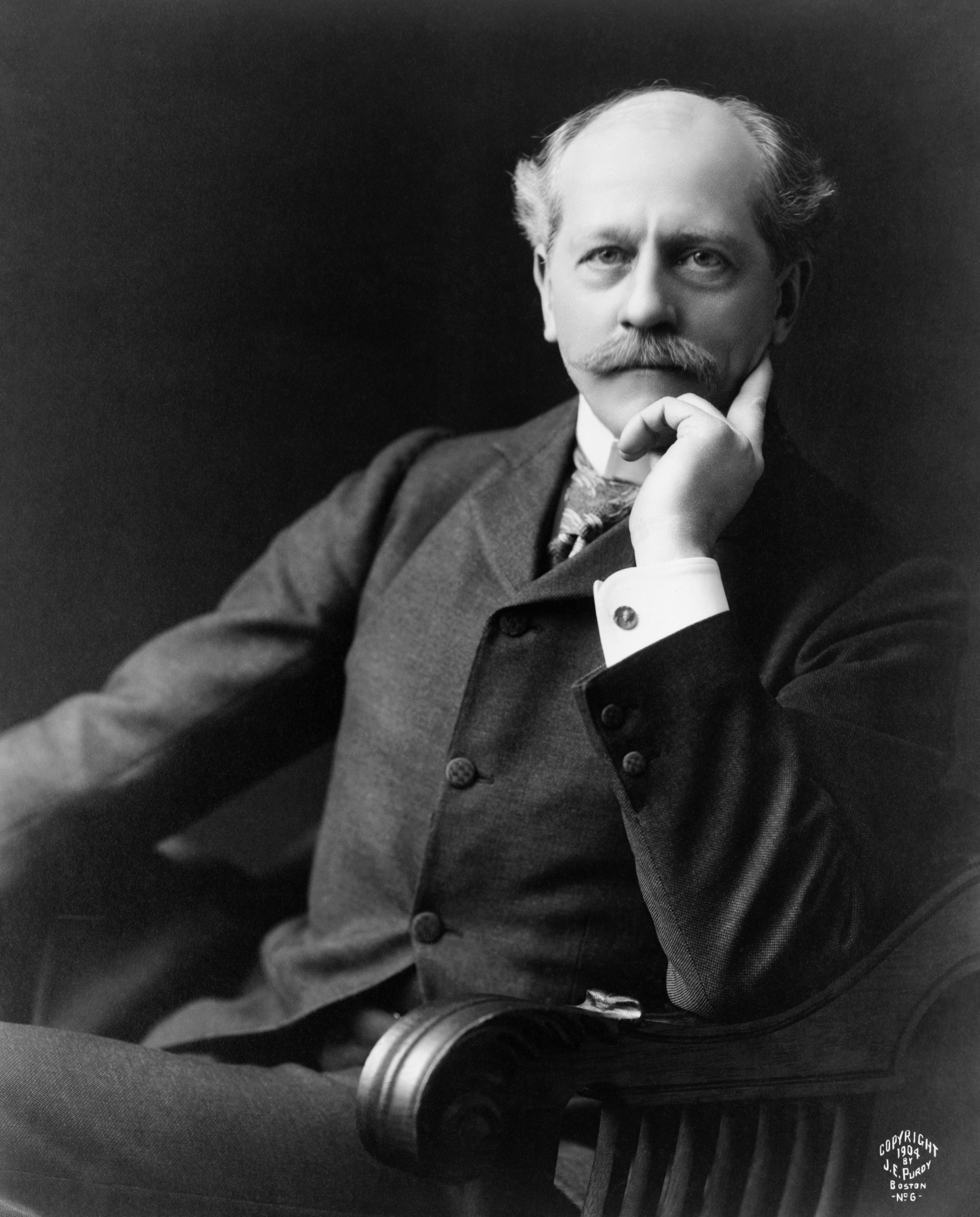
Percival Lowell
