= USS Lamberton =

Wickes-class destroyer

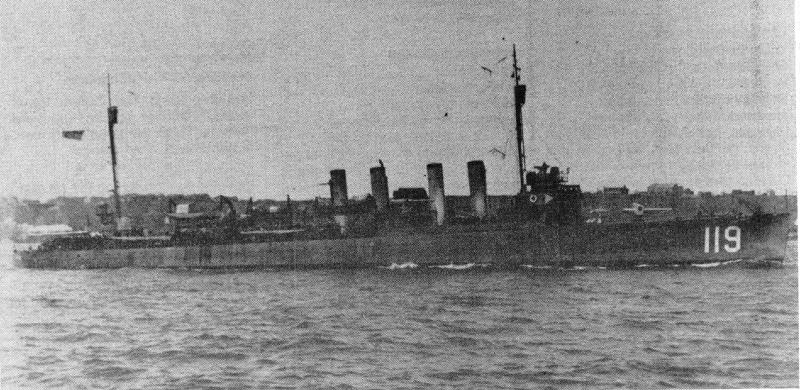
- USS Lamberton underway

History

United States
- Name: Lamberton
- Namesake: Benjamin P. Lamberton (1844–1912), U.S. Navy admiral
- Builder: Newport News Shipbuilding and Drydock Company, Newport News, Virginia
- Laid down: 1 October 1917
- Launched: 30 March 1918
- Commissioned: 22 August 1918
- Decommissioned: 30 June 1922
- Recommissioned: 15 November 1930
- Decommissioned: 13 December 1946
- Reclassified: 16 April 1932, AG-21; 19 November 1940, DMS-2; 5 June 1945, AG-21
- Honors and awards: One battle star for World War II
- Fate: Sold for scrapping 9 May 1947

General characteristics
- Class & type: Wickes-class destroyer
- Displacement: 1,090 tons
- Length: 314 ft 5 in (95.8 m)
- Beam: 31 ft 8 in (9.7 m)
- Draft: 8 ft 8 in (2.6 m)
- Speed: 35 kn (65 km/h)
- Complement: 113 officers and enlisted
- Armament: 4 × 4 in (102 mm)/50 guns; 2 × 3 in (76 mm)/23 guns; 1 × depth charge projector; 2 × depth charge tracks

USS Lamberton (DD-119)/(DMS-2) was a Wickes-class destroyer in the United States Navy in commission from 1918 to 1922 and from 1930 to 1946. She saw service during World War II. She was the only ship named for Benjamin P. Lamberton, a rear admiral who served with Admiral Dewey in the Battle of Manila Bay in 1898 during the Spanish–American War.

== Construction and commissioning ==
Lamberton was laid down on 1 October 1917 by the Newport News Shipbuilding and Drydock Company at Newport News, Virginia. She was launched on 30 March 1918, sponsored by Miss Isabell Stedman Lamberton, Admiral Lamberton's granddaughter. The vessel was commissioned on 22 August 1918, Lieutenant Commander Frank Slingluff, Jr. in command.

== Service history ==
=== Pre-World War II ===
After shakedown in the Caribbean Sea, Lamberton joined the United States Atlantic Fleet for maneuvers in the Atlantic Ocean off the Azores in early 1919. Reassigned to the newly formed United States Pacific Fleet, she departed Hampton Roads, Virginia, on 19 July 1919 and arrived at San Diego, California, on 7 August 1919.

Based at San Diego, Lamberton operated along the United States West Coast from August 1919 until June 1922. She participated in training maneuvers and performed experiments to improve naval tactics. She was decommissioned at San Diego on 30 June 1922.

Lamberton recommissioned on 15 November 1930, Lieutenant Commander S. N. Moore in command. Operating along the U.S. West Coast, she performed training exercises for nearly two years. She was reclassified as a "miscellaneous auxiliary," AG-21, on 16 April 1932 and was converted to a target-towing ship. From 1933 until 1940 she operated from San Diego towing targets for surface ships, submarines, and aircraft. She also engaged in experimental minesweeping exercises off the U.S. West Coast and was reclassified as a "destroyer minesweeper", DMS-2, on 19 November 1940. The actor Ernest Borgnine served aboard Lamberton until his discharge from the Navy in September 1941. (Note: Ernest Borgnine soon reenlisted in the U.S. Navy and served during World War II.) After arriving at Pearl Harbor, Territory of Hawaii, on 11 September 1941, Lamberton resumed target towing and anti-submarine warfare (ASW) screening operations in the Hawaiian Islands.

=== World War II ===
Lamberton was escorting the heavy cruiser USS Minneapolis (CA-36) to Oahu in the Hawaiian Islands when the Japanese attacked Pearl Harbor on 7 December 1941, bringing the United States into World War II. Following the attack, she returned to Pearl Harbor to sweep the harbor for mines. For the next seven months she remained on offshore patrol in the Hawaiian Islands.

Departing Pearl Harbor on 11 July 1942, Lamberton steamed north, arriving at Kodiak on Kodiak Island in the Territory of Alaska on 18 July 1942. She performed patrol and escort duty in the North Pacific Ocean during the Aleutian Islands campaign. In mid-May 1943, she escorted the U.S. Navy task group which brought reinforcements for the second amphibious landing at Massacre Bay on Attu Island during the Battle of Attu. Lamberton continued patrol operations off Attu until late June 1943, when she departed for Kuluk Bay on Adak Island. She then steamed to San Diego, arriving there on 23 July 1943. For the rest of World War II, she performed target-towing operations off the U.S. West Coast and from Pearl Harbor. Lamberton was reclassified as a miscellaneous auxiliary and again redesignated AG-21 on 5 June 1945, and, following the Japanese surrender that ended the war in August 1945, she operated as an auxiliary ship based at San Diego.

On 9 October 1945 Lamberton was one of 266 vessels damaged by Typhoon Louise when it struck Okinawa, and was one of 222 ships that ran aground during the typhoon. (Note: The Naval History and Heritage Command still refers to Lamberton by her "DMS-2" hull classification symbol at the time of Typhoon Louise.) She later was refloated and returned to duty.

== Decommissioning and disposal ==
Lamberton was decommissioned at Bremerton, Washington, on 13 December 1946 and was sold on 9 May 1947 to National Metal and Steel Corporation at Terminal Island in Los Angeles, California, for scrapping.

== Awards ==
Lamberton received one battle star for her World War II service.
