= Duncan, Kentucky =

Duncan is the name of two places in the U.S. state of Kentucky in the United States of America:

- Duncan, Casey County, Kentucky
- Duncan, Mercer County, Kentucky
