= Judge Duncan =

Judge Duncan may refer to:

- Allyson K. Duncan (born 1951), judge of the United States Court of Appeals for the Fourth Circuit
- Charles T. Duncan (1838–1915), judge of the county court of Lee County, Virginia
- John Alton Duncan (1932–2007), judge of the Manitoba Superior Court
- Kyle Duncan (judge) (born 1972), judge of the United States Court of Appeals for the Fifth Circuit
- Richard M. Duncan (1889–1974), judge of the United States District Courts for the Eastern and the Western Districts of Missouri
- Robert Morton Duncan (1927–2012), judge of the United States District Court for the Southern District of Ohio

== See also ==
- Justice Duncan (disambiguation)
