= Mungy Branch =

Stream in Missouri, United States of America

Mungy Branch is a stream in northwestern Phelps and northeastern Pulaski counties in the Ozarks of the U.S. state of Missouri. It is a tributary of Duncan Creek.

The stream headwaters arise in extreme eastern Pulaski County just east of Missouri Route MM about 3.5 miles east of Dixon (at 37°59′03″N 92°01′31″W). The stream flows east to its confluence with Duncan Creek in Phelps County (at 37°59′24″N 91°58′43″W) about one-half mile above that stream's confluence with the Gasconade River.

Mungy Branch has the name of the local Mungy family.

== See also ==
- List of rivers of Missouri
