= Benjamin P. Lamberton =

Benjamin Peffer Lamberton
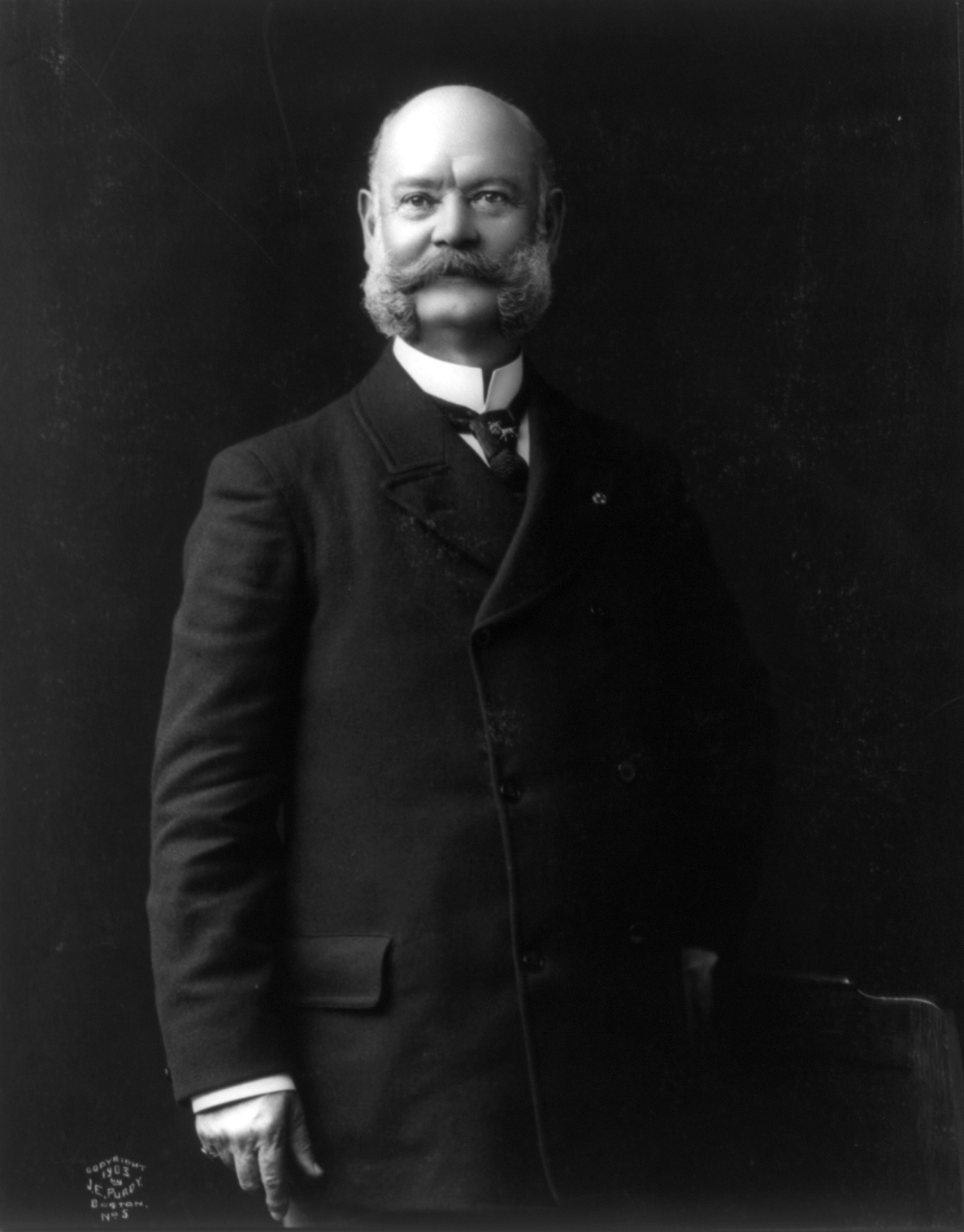
- Lamberton in 1903, photo by James E. Purdy
- Born: February 25, 1844; Cumberland County, Pennsylvania
- Died: June 9, 1912 (aged 68); Washington, D.C.
- Burial place: Arlington National Cemetery
- Military career
- Allegiance: United States of America
- Branch: United States Navy
- Service years: 1861–1906
- Rank: Rear admiral
- Commands: USS Olympia; South Atlantic Squadron
- Conflicts: American Civil War; Spanish–American War

Benjamin Peffer Lamberton (February 25, 1844 – June 9, 1912) was a rear admiral in the United States Navy, who served in the Spanish–American War.

== Biography ==
Benjamin Peffer Lamberton was born in Cumberland County, Pennsylvania. He attended Carlisle High School and the Dickinson Preparatory School before spending three years as a member of the Dickinson College class of 1862. He was a Member of Belles Lettres Literary Society.

Having decided on a naval career Lamberton transferred to the Naval Academy, and was appointed midshipman on September 21, 1861. He graduated on November 22, 1864 in time to see active service on the America as it pursued the Confederate raiders Florida and Tallahassee in 1864.

In 1865, he was attached to the steam sloop Susquehanna of the Brazil Squadron, then in the steam-sloop Juniata in 1866–67, receiving promotion to ensign on November 1, 1866, and to master on December 1, 1866.

Lamberton served aboard the training ship Saratoga in 1867–69, being commissioned as lieutenant on March 12, 1867. He served with the rank of lieutenant commander from December 18, 1868, to June 2, 1885, when he was promoted to commander and assigned to the Lighthouse Board in Charleston as an inspector.

In 1898, Lamberton was ordered to command of the protected cruiser Boston on the Asiatic Squadron, but upon arrival in Hong Kong was appointed chief of staff on board Admiral George Dewey's flagship Olympia.

He saw action the Battle of Manila Bay on May 1, 1898. An incident during the heat of the battle demonstrated the ardor of Olympia's crew. On learning of Dewey's decision to give the crew a break for breakfast, a gun captain commented to Captain Lamberton, "For God's sake, Captain, don’t let us stop now. To hell with breakfast!"

Lamberton was promoted to captain on May 17, 1898, and took command of the Olympia.

Promoted to rear admiral on September 11, 1903, he commanded the South Atlantic Squadron. His final post was as chairman of the Lighthouse Board from which he retired on his sixty-second birthday in 1906.

Lamberton died on June 9, 1912, and is buried in Arlington National Cemetery.

== Personal life ==
Benjamin Peffer Lamberton married Elizabeth Stedman in February 1873 in Boston, Massachusetts, and had three children. He lived in Washington, D.C. during his retirement, enjoying duck hunting and fishing with his friend President Grover Cleveland.

== Namesake ==
The destroyer USS Lamberton (DD-119), launched on 30 March 1918, was named after him.
