= Falklands Expedition =

1831–1832 United States naval action in the Falkland Islands

USS Lexington raid on the Falkland Islands
- Part of the Falkland Islands sovereignty dispute
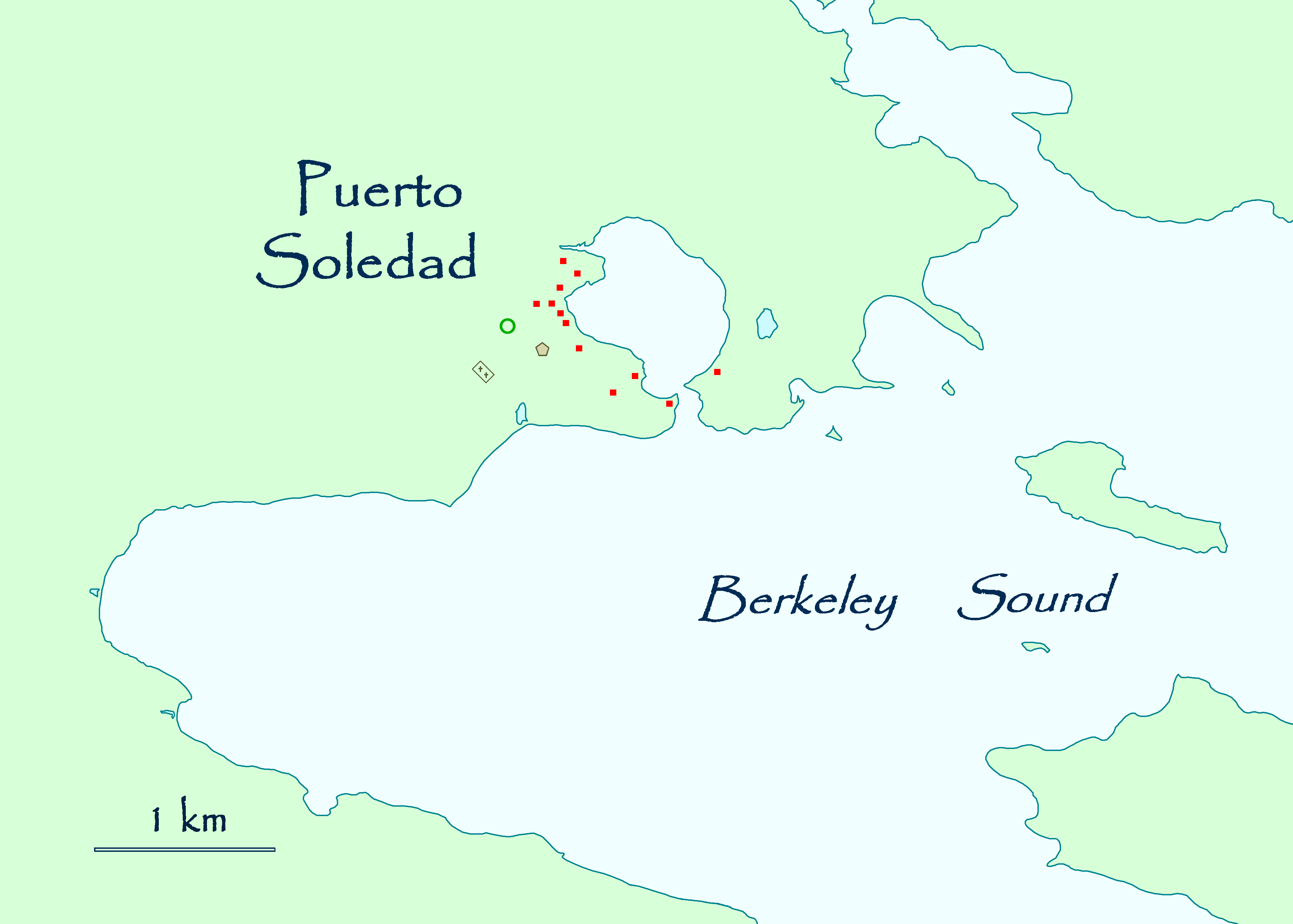
- A map of historic Puerto Soledad.
- Operational scope: Naval expedition and landing
- Location: Puerto Luis, East Falkland
- Commanded by: Silas Duncan
- Date: December 28, 1831 – January 22, 1832
- Executed by: USS Lexington
- Outcome: Americans released; settlement defences disabled

The USS Lexington raid on the Falkland Islands was a United States naval action against the settlement at Puerto Luis between December 28, 1831, and January 22, 1832. It followed the seizure of three American sealing vessels by forces acting under Luis Vernet, whom the government of Buenos Aires had appointed political and military commander of the islands in 1829. The United States disputed the authority claimed by Argentina to regulate American sealing around the islands and demanded the restoration of the vessels and their cargoes.

== Background ==
American vessels had long engaged in sealing around the Falkland Islands, and the United States had not recognised the authority claimed there by Buenos Aires. In June 1829, the Buenos Aires government appointed Vernet political and military commander and charged him with enforcing regulations concerning the seal fishery. The following year, Vernet circulated warnings that vessels violating the regulations could be seized.

On 15 January 1831, a complaint about the restrictions was forwarded to US Secretary of State Martin Van Buren. Van Buren instructed the American representative in Buenos Aires to investigate and protest measures interfering with what the United States regarded as established American fishing rights. The instruction also rejected the title claimed by Buenos Aires, but the American representative died before taking action on it.

On 30 July 1831, Vernet ordered the seizure of the American vessels Harriet, Superior and Breakwater after their captains disregarded his restrictions. Vernet took the Harriet, Captain Gilbert Davison and its crew to Buenos Aires for legal proceedings.

== Diplomatic dispute ==
After the Harriet reached Buenos Aires in November 1831, United States consul George W. Slacum protested its seizure and demanded compensation. Slacum asserted that the United States did not recognise the jurisdiction claimed by Argentina over the Falklands and that American sealing there was lawful. Argentine foreign minister Tomás Manuel de Anchorena rejected Slacum's authority to submit a formal diplomatic protest and maintained that Vernet had acted under Argentine authority.

The Lexington had been assigned to the United States Navy's Brazil Squadron in June 1831, before the American government learned of the seizure of the three vessels. Its general instructions were to protect American commerce and citizens by lawful means. The ship arrived at Buenos Aires on November 27. Slacum sought the support of Duncan and threatened military action against the settlement if Buenos Aires did not provide a satisfactory response.

== Raid ==
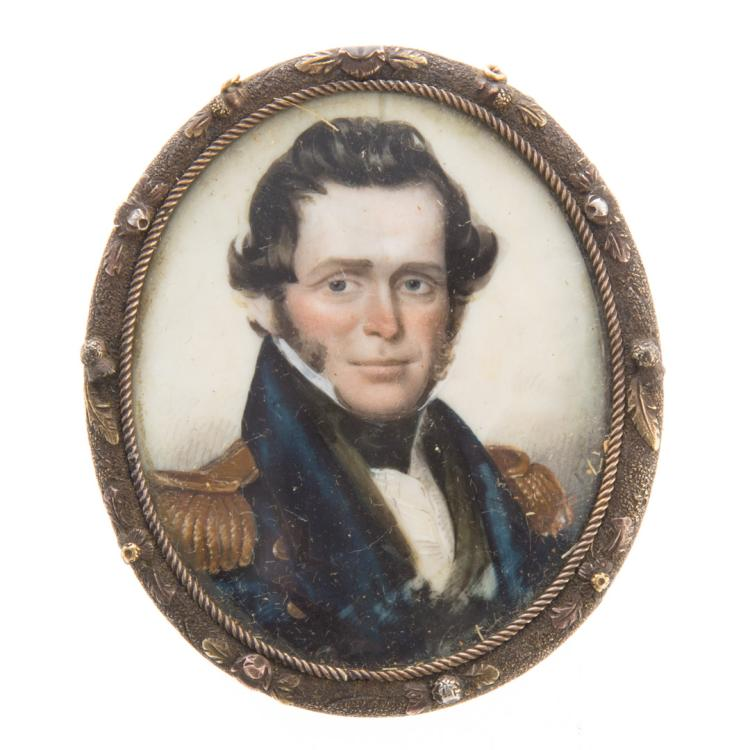
Miniature portrait of Silas Duncan by George Catlin (undated).

After efforts to obtain restitution at Buenos Aires failed, Duncan sailed from Buenos Aires with Davison as his pilot on 9 December 1831, . The Lexington entered Berkeley Sound on December 28. On 1 January 1832, Duncan sent a landing party of fifteen marines and naval personnel ashore while additional armed boats approached the settlement. The landing parties released detained Americans and took seven members of the settlement into custody.

Accounts differ over the manner and extent of the operation. Testimony subsequently collected by Argentine authorities stated that the Lexington entered the harbour under French colours and that Duncan's men spiked cannon, seized weapons, burned gunpowder, entered buildings and removed property claimed by Davison. Duncan's own report emphasised the release of Americans and the disabling of weapons that could be used against American shipping.

At the request of inhabitants who wished to leave, members of the Lexington helped pack their belongings for transportation to Montevideo. On January 22, the Lexington sailed for Montevideo carrying 20 men, eight women, ten children and seven prisoners. Some gauchos who had fled into the interior remained on the islands.

== United States response ==
After learning of the seizures, US President Andrew Jackson appointed Francis Baylies as chargé d'affaires and dispatched Captain George W. Rodgers with instructions to determine whether Vernet had acted under Argentine authority. If the seizures had been officially authorised, Rodgers was not to undertake punitive action. Duncan had already completed the raid before those instructions could be implemented.

After the raid, Jackson nevertheless endorsed Duncan's conduct after receiving his report and was satisfied with their promptness and effectiveness. No court of inquiry or court-martial was convened concerning the raid.

Argentine authorities condemned the operation and terminated official communications with Slacum. Rodgers returned the seven prisoners in April 1832 in an attempt to improve relations, while Baylies defended Duncan's conduct and rejected an Argentine proposal to refer the dispute to a neutral power. Baylies left his post in September 1832 after the dispute disrupted diplomatic relations between the two countries. Another United States chargé d'affaires was not appointed until 1844.

== See also ==
- Brazil Squadron
- Falkland Islands sovereignty dispute
- History of the Falkland Islands
- Reassertion of British sovereignty over the Falkland Islands (1833)
- USS Lexington

== Sources ==
- Klafter, Craig Evan (1984). "United States Involvement in the Falkland Islands Crisis of 1831–1833". Journal of the Early Republic. 4 (4): 395–420. doi:10.2307/3123118. JSTOR 3123118.
- Maisch, Christian J. (2000). "The Falkland/Malvinas Islands Clash of 1831–32: U.S. and British Diplomacy in the South Atlantic". Diplomatic History. 24 (2): 185–209. doi:10.1111/0145-2096.00212. JSTOR 24913798.
