= Alicia Van Buren =

American composer

Alicia Keisker Van Buren (5 March 1860 – 11 April 1922) was an American composer, singer, painter, and poet.

Van Buren was born in Louisville, Kentucky, where she attended public and unspecified private schools. She married Albert Van Buren and they lived in Louisville and Brookline, Massachusetts, spending the winters at their home in Florida.

Albert Van Buren was a serious amateur painter who studied with marine artist Charles H. Woodbury. In Brookline, the Van Burens socialized in artistic, literary, and musical circles, with composers Amy Beach and Helen Archibald Clarke, and with authors Oscar Fay Adams, Franz Bellinger, Abbie Farwell Brown, Margaret Wade Campbell Deland, Louise Chandler Moulton, Josephine Preston Peabody, and James Whitcomb Riley.

Van Buren's papers and correspondence are archived at Schlesinger Library, Radcliffe Institute. Her music was published by Breitkopf & Haertel. Her books of poetry were published by Richard G. Badger's Gorham Press. Her publications included:

== Books ==
- As Thought is Led: Lyrics and Sonnets (1904)
- Fireflies: Lyrics and Sonnets (1913)

== Chamber ==
- String Quartet

== Orchestra ==
- Daffodils: A Tone Poem

== Vocal ==
- "Afar"
- Book of Songs
- "Constancy"
- Five Songs
- "In Early Spring" (text by William Wordsworth)
- "June Song"
- "November" (text by John Townsend Trowbridge)
- Six Songs
