= USS Darlington =

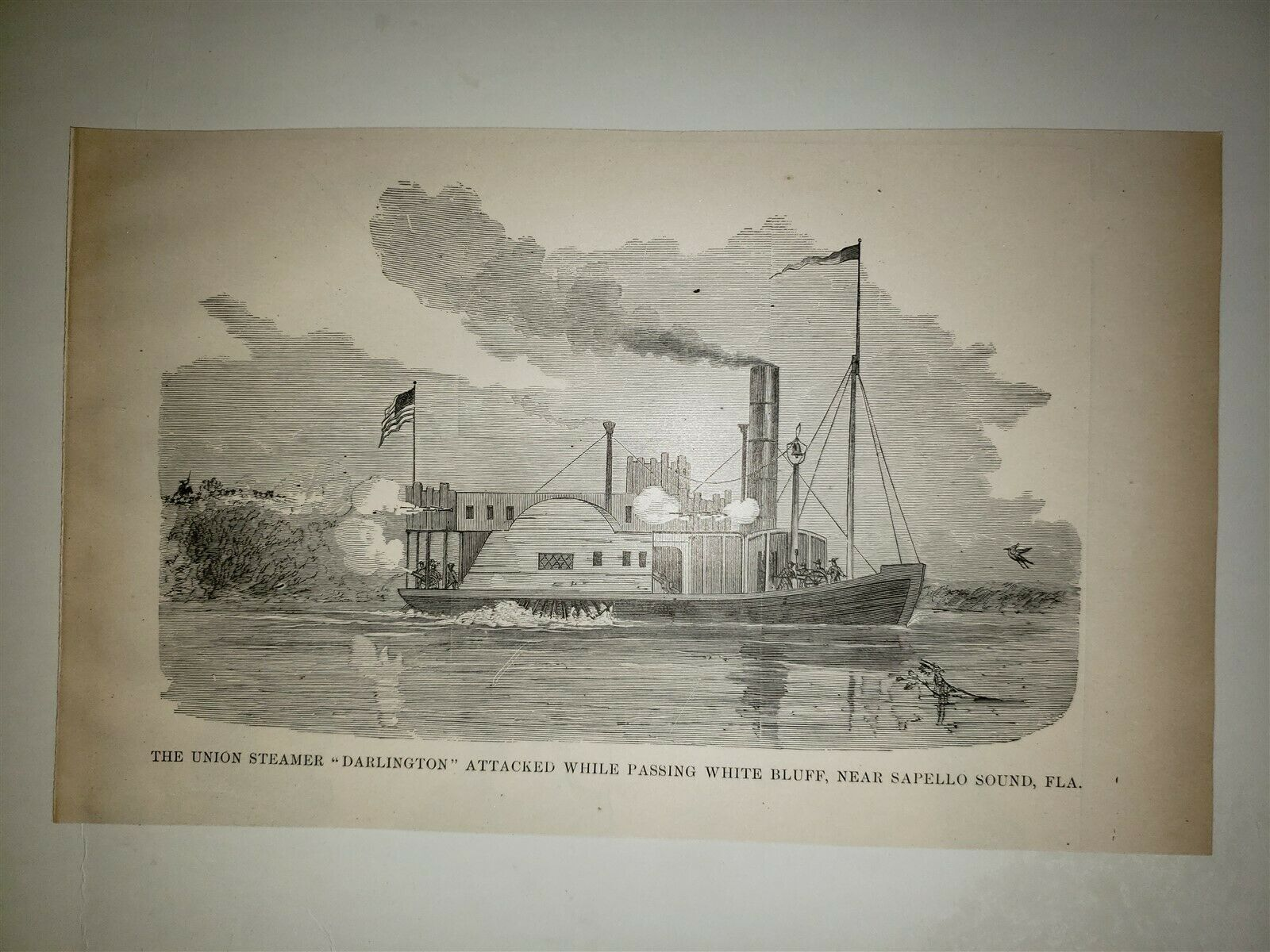
- The union steamer "Darlington" attacked while passing White Bluff, near Sapello Sound, Fla.

History

United States
- Name: Confederate steamship Darlington
- Laid down: date unknown
- Launched: date unknown
- Acquired: 1862
- In service: 1862
- Out of service: 1862
- Stricken: 1862 (est.)
- Captured: by Union Forces; 3 March 1862
- Fate: Transferred to the Union Army, September 1862

General characteristics
- Displacement: 300 tons
- Length: not known
- Beam: not known
- Draught: not known
- Propulsion: steam engine; side-wheel propelled
- Speed: not known
- Complement: 23
- Armament: one howitzer

USS Darlington was a captured Confederate steamer acquired by the Union Navy from the prize court during the American Civil War. She was put into service by the Union Navy to patrol navigable waterways of the Confederacy to prevent the South from trading with other countries.

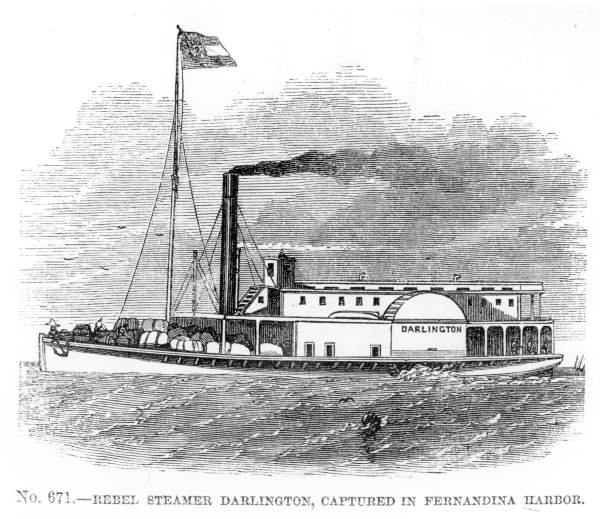
Gunboat CSS Darlington.

== Captured steamer converted to Union Navy use ==
Darlington, a Confederate 300 ton steamer, was captured by boats from USS Pawnee in Cumberland Sound, Florida, 3 March 1862, with a cargo of army wagons, ammunition, and camp equipment on board.

== East Coast operations ==
She was taken over and, with a crew of 23 and one howitzer as armament, USS Darlington was employed by the Union Navy for use in the waters off Fernandina, Florida, and Port Royal, South Carolina, with Acting Master J. W. Godfrey in command.

Darlington assisted the boats of the side-wheel steamer USS Ellen and the USS Wabash in raising the yacht USS America in St. Johns River, Florida, from 18 to 25 March 1862.

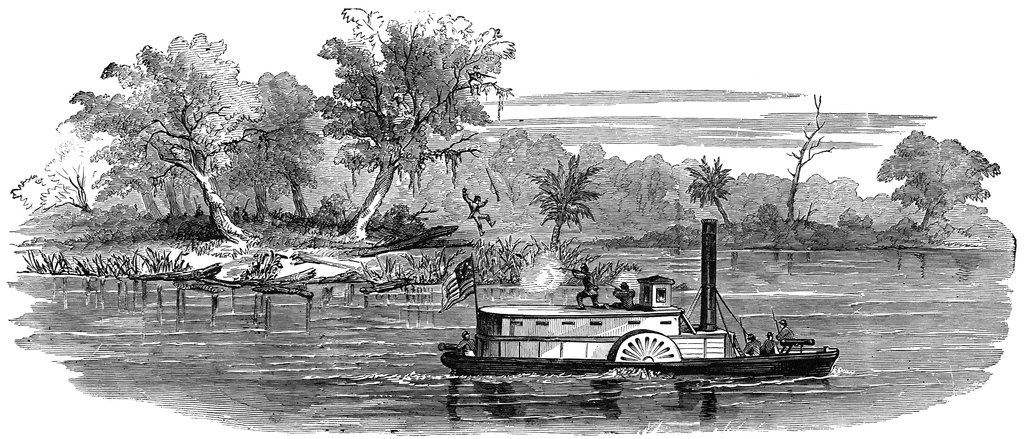
United States Army Transport Darlington.

== Transfer to the Union Army ==
She was transferred to the Union Army for use as a transport in September 1862.

== See also ==
- Ships captured in the American Civil War
- Union Navy
- Confederate States Navy
- List of schooners
