= Duncanville =

Duncanville may refer to:

== Places ==
- Duncanville, Alabama, USA; an unincorporated community
- Duncanville, Illinois, USA; an unincorporated community
- Duncanville, Texas, USA; a city
  - Duncanville Independent School District
    - Duncanville High School
  - Duncanville Air Force Station

== Other uses ==
- Duncanville (TV series), an American animated sitcom

== See also ==
- Duncan (disambiguation)
- Ville (disambiguation)
