= Louise Chandler Moulton =

American poet (1835–1908)

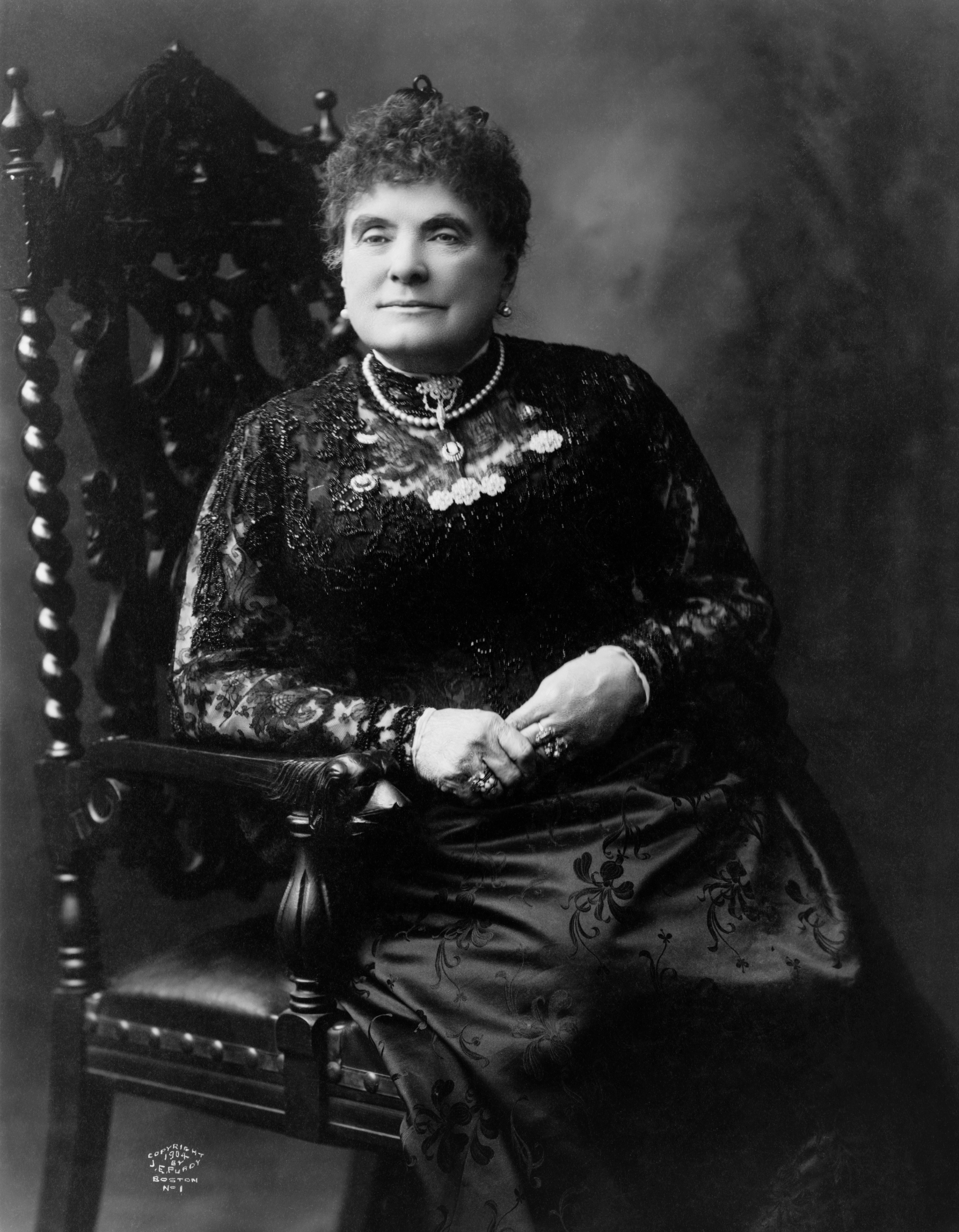
- 1904 photograph by J. E. Purdy & Co., Boston
- Born: Ellen Louise Chandler; April 10, 1835; Pomfret, Connecticut, U.S.
- Died: August 10, 1908 (aged 73); Boston, Massachusetts, U.S.
- Occupations: poet, story-writer and critic
- Spouse: William Upham Moulton (m. 1855)
- Writing career
- Language: English

Louise Chandler Moulton (April 10, 1835 – August 10, 1908) was an American poet, story-writer and critic. Contributing poems and stories of power and grace to the leading magazines, Harper's Magazine, The Atlantic, The Galaxy, the first Scribner's, she also published a half-dozen very successful books for children, Bedtime Stories, Firelight Stories, Stories Told at Twilight, and others that were considered popular in their day. She collected a few of her many adult tales into volumes, Miss Eyre of Boston and Some Women's Hearts. It is in Boston that she did the greater part of her work, including her books of travel, Random Rambles and Lazy Tours, published her four volumes of poetry, and edited and prefaced biographies, A Last Harvest and Garden Secrets, and the Collected Poems of Philip Bourke Marston, as well as a selection from Arthur O'Shaughnessy's verses.

== Childhood and education ==
Ellen Louise Chandler was born April 10, 1835, in Pomfret, Connecticut, the only child of Lucius L. Chandler and Louisa R. (Clark) Chandler.

Moulton's imagination was fostered during her childhood. Her parents clung to the strictest Calvinistic principles. Games, dances, romances, were forbidden; and, as playmates were few, the child lived in a world of fancy. "I was lonely," she said, "and I sought companions. What was there to do but to create them?" Indeed, before she was eight years old, her active mind was creating a world of its own in a little unwritten play, which it pleased her fancy to call a Spanish drama, and with which she spent all summer, filling it with personages. The rigid Calvinism of the family had undoubtedly a very stimulating effect on the emotions of the sensitive child, and to its far-reaching influence may be ascribed the tinge of melancholy found in many of her pages. As a child, Moulton also exhibited a great vitality, especially when she was not burdened with the terrors of "damnation". Running in the face of a great wind was one of her joys, and she realized the reverse of such emotion in listening to the sound of the wind through an outer keyhole, which seemed to her the calling of trumpets, the crying of lost souls.

She was sent to school at an early age, eventually becoming the pupil of the Rev. Roswell Park, at that time rector of the Episcopal church in Pomfret, and also the head of a school called Christ Church Hall. It was a school for boys as well as girls; and one of her schoolmates here, for a season, was James Abbott McNeill Whistler. She kept the pictures that he drew for her in those days.

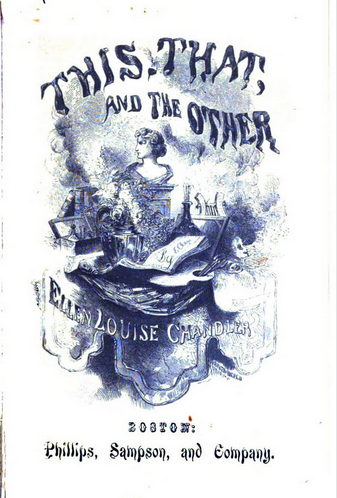
This, That, and the Other

At the age of 15, Moulton began to publish the work which she had written for the past eight years. It would be difficult to say what it was that inclined her to a literary life as she had no literary friends. She felt her movements had to be secret as if she were committing a crime when she sent off her first verses to a daily paper published in Norwich, Connecticut. It was on her way from school one day that she happened to take the paper from the office; and, when she opened it, there were the lines she had written. Three years later, Messrs. Phillips, Sampson and Company, of Boston, published for her "This, That, and the Other," a collection of stories and poems which had appeared in various magazines and newspapers.

Directly after the publication of this first book, Moulton went for a final school-year to Emma Willard's Troy Female Seminary in August 1854, finishing in 1855.

== Career ==
=== Early years ===
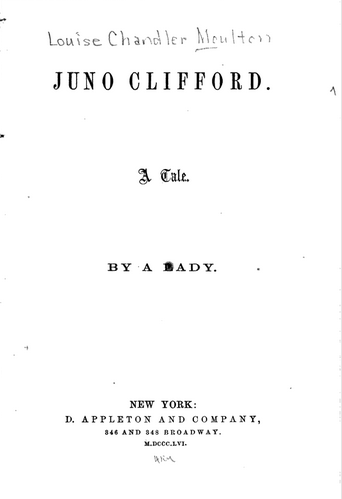
Juno Clifford

Six weeks after leaving the Troy Female Seminary, on August 27, 1855, she married a Boston publisher, William Upham Moulton (d. 1898), under whose auspices her earliest literary work had appeared in The True Flag. In 1855, she published, Juno Clifford, a story issued anonymously ("By A Lady"; 1855), and by My Third Book followed in 1859.

=== Post American Civil War ===
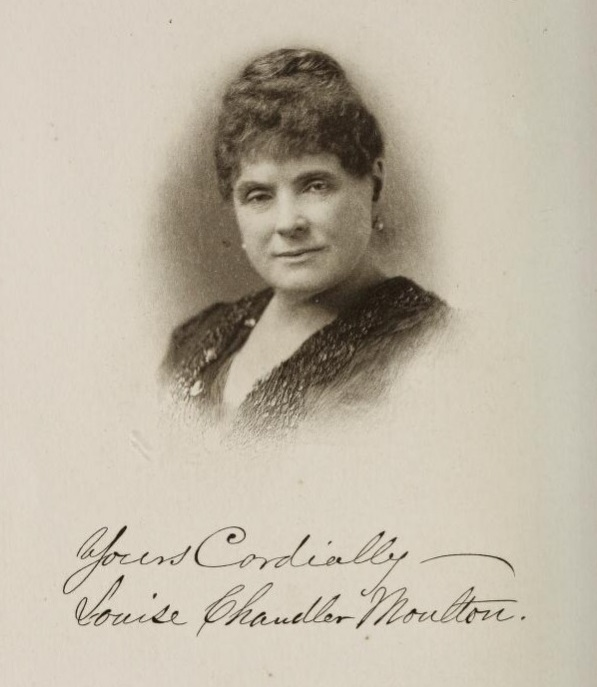
Frontispiece of Poets and Sonnets of Louise Chandler Moulton (1909)

Her literary output was interrupted until 1873 when she resumed activity with Bed-time Stories, the first of a series of volumes, including Firelight Stories (1883) and Stories told at Twilight (1890).

Meanwhile, she had taken an important place in American literary society, writing regular critiques for the New York Tribune from 1870 to 1876. Serving as the paper's Boston literary correspondent, she wrote a series of interesting letters concerning the literary life of Boston, giving advance reviews of new books and telling of the affairs of the Radical Club. In all the six years during which these letters appeared, she never made in them any unkind statement, or wrote a sentence that could cause pain. Through all her critical work, she has exercised a tender regard for the feelings of others, as well as great generosity of praise, preferring rather to be silent than to utter an unkindness.

Her first voyage to Europe was made in January 1876. Pausing in London long enough to see Queen Victoria open Parliament in person for the first time after the Prince Consort's death, she hastened through Paris on her way to Rome to view old palaces, gardens, and galleries, touched to tears by Pope Pius IX's benediction, enjoying the hospitality of the studios of Elihu Vedder, John Rollin Tilton, and others, and of the gracious and charming social life of Rome. Her descriptions of all this, overflowing with the sensitiveness to beauty which was a part of her nature, made her Random Rambles interesting reading. After Rome, she visited Florence, and then Venice, and then again Paris, and again London and the London season. Entertained by Lord Houghton, she met Robert Browning and Algernon Charles Swinburne, George Eliot, Alexander William Kinglake, Theodore Watts-Dunton, and others, seeing especially a great deal of Browning who said, "Her voice, wherein all sweetnesses abide," having as much to do with all this as her literary excellence.

In the winter of 1876, the Macmillans brought out her first volume of Poems (renamed Swallow flights in the English edition of 1877), which was highly praised by the critics. The Examiner spoke of the power and originality of the verses, of the music and the intensity as surpassing any verse of George Eliot's, declaring that the sonnet entitled "One Dread" might have been written by Sir Philip Sidney. The Athenaeum also dwelt on the vivid and subtle imagination and delicate loveliness of these verses and their perfection of technique. The Academy spoke warmly of their felicity of epithet, their healthiness, their suggestiveness, their imaginative force pervaded by the depth and sweetness of perfect womanhood. The Tattler pronounced her a mistress of form and of artistic perfection, saying also that England had no poet in such full sympathy with woods and winds and waves, finding in her the one truly natural singer in an age of aesthetic imitation. "She gives the effect of the sudden note of the thrush," it said. "She is as spontaneous as Walther von der Vogelweide. The Times, The Morning Post, the Literary World, all welcomed the book with equally warm praise, and The Pall Mall Gazette spoke of her lyrical feeling as like that which gave a unique charm to Heinrich Heine's songs. She had met very few of these critics, and their cordial recognition was as surprising to her as it was delightful. Among the innumerable letters which she received, filled with admiring warmth, were some from Matthew Arnold, Henry Austin Dobson, Frederick Locker, and William Bell Scott.

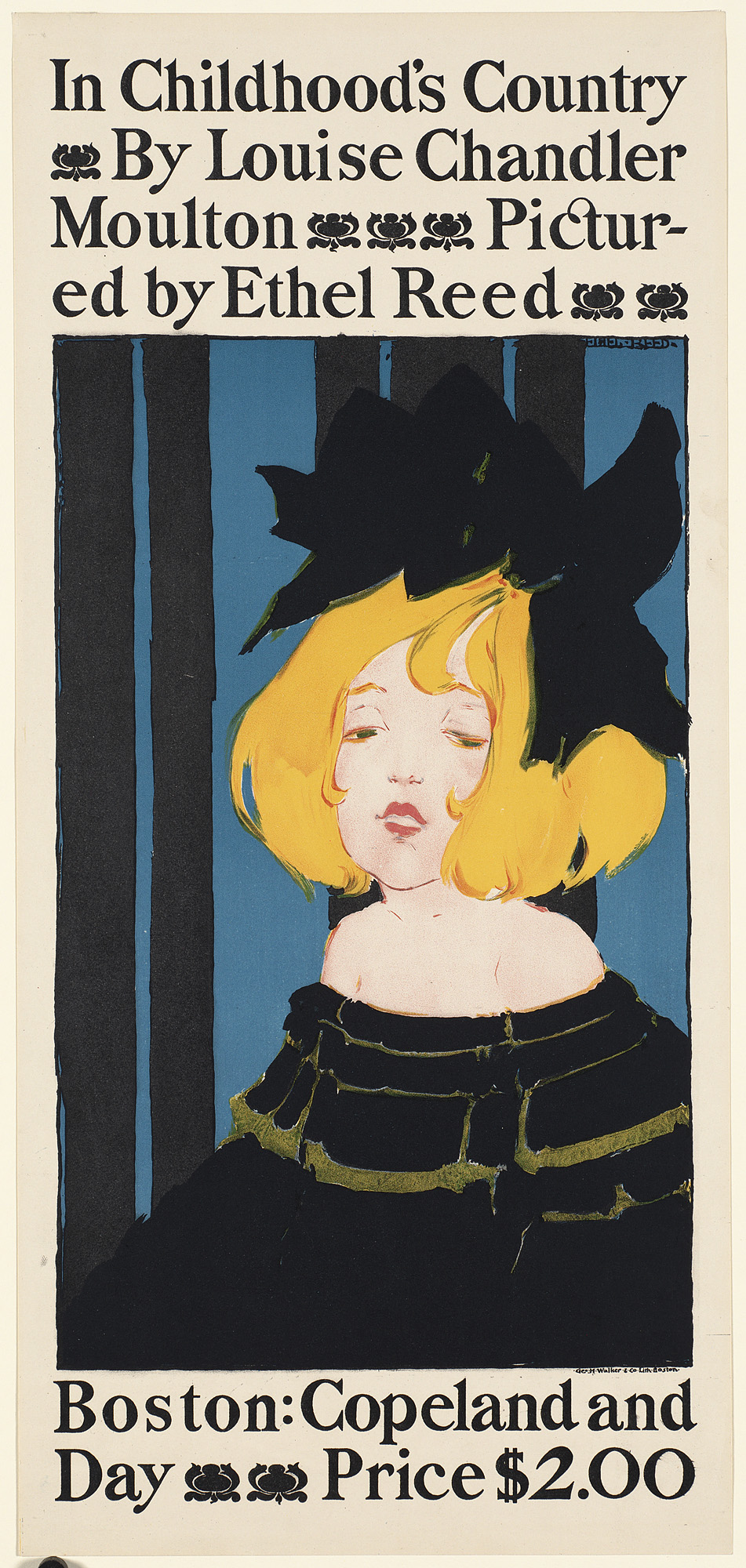
In Childhood's Country by Louise Chandler Moulton

Her songs were set to music by Francesco Berger and Lady Charlesmont, and later on by Margaret Ruthven Lang, Arthur Foote, Ethelbert Nevin, and many others. Marston wrote her, "Much as we all love and admire your work, it seems to me we have not yet fully realized the unostentatious loveliness of your lyrics, as fine for lyrics as your best sonnets are for sonnets. 'How Long' struck me more than ever. The first verse is eminently characteristic of you, exhibiting in a very marked degree what runs through nearly all of your poems, the most exquisite and subtle blending of strong emotion with the sense of external nature. It seems to me this perfect poem is possessed by the melancholy yet tender music of winds sighing at twilight, in some churchyard, through old trees that watch beside silent graves. Then nothing can be more subtly beautiful than the closing lines of the sonnet, 'In Time to Come':— "'Which was it spoke to you, the wind or I? I think you, musing, scarcely will have heard.'" Marston wrote her again concerning "The House of Death" that it was one of the most beautiful, the most powerful poems he knew. "No poem gives me such an idea of the heartlessness of Nature. The poem is Death within and Summer without—light girdling darkness—and it leaves a picture and impression on the mind never to be effaced." The poem of "The House of Death" is unequalled in its tragic beauty and sweetness. It was apropos of this volume that in one of his letters to her Robert Browning said he had closed the book with music in his ears and flowers before his eyes, and not without thoughts across his brain. And it was concerning a later poem, "Laus Veneris," inspired by a painting of his own, that Edward Burne-Jones said it made him work all the more confidently and was a real refreshment.

One of Moulton's most appreciative, scholastic, and discriminating critics was Professor John Meiklejohn. He has said with authority that she deserved to be classed with the best Elizabethan lyricists in her lyrics,—with Robert Herrick and Thomas Campion and Shakespeare,—while in her sonnets she might rightly take a place with John Milton and William Wordsworth and Christina Rossetti. "I cannot tell you how keen and great enjoyment (sometimes even rapture)," he wrote her, "I have got out of your exquisite lyrics." In a series of "Notes," following the poems, line by line, he asserted that the poet won her success by the simplest means and plainest words, as true genius always does, and that her pages were full of emotional and imaginative meaning, Nature and Poetry uniting in an indissoluble whole; and Shelley himself, he said, would have been proud to own certain of the lines. The poem "Quest" he found so beautiful that, in his own words, it was "difficult to speak of it in perfectly measured and unexaggerated language." Of the poem "Wife to Husband" he said that "the tenderness, the sweet and compelling rhythm, are worthy of the best Elizabethan days." The sonnet, "A Summer's Growth," "unites," he says, the "passion of such Italian poets as Dante with the imagination of modern English." This was in relation to her first volume, "Swallow Flights"; and in conclusion he said: "This poet must look for her brothers in the sixteenth and seventeenth centuries among the noble and intense lyrists. Her insight, her subtlety, her delicacy, her music, are hardly matched, and certainly not surpassed by Herrick or Campion or Crashaw or Carew or Herbert or Vaughan."

=== Later years ===
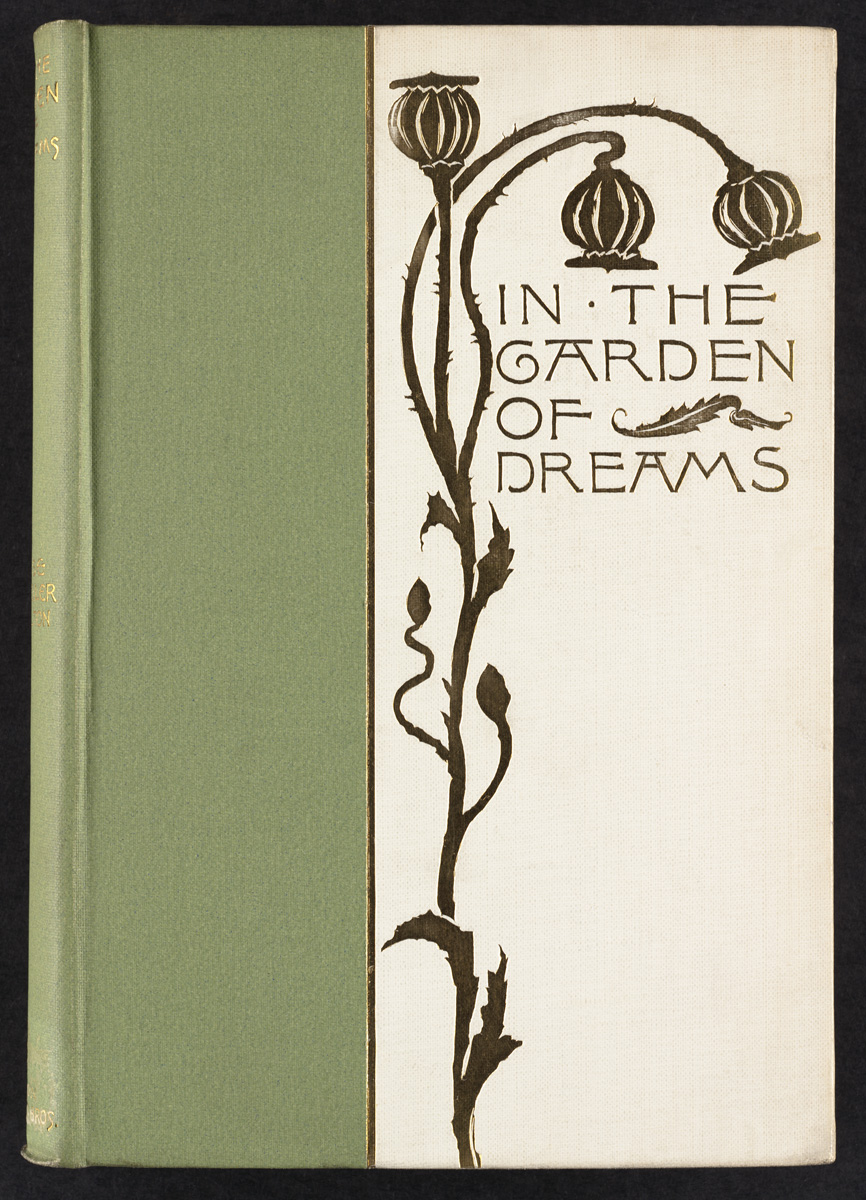
In the garden of dreams

She wrote a weekly literary letter for the Sunday issue of the Boston Herald from 1886 to 1892. Thenceforward, she spent the summers in London and the rest of the year in Boston, where her salon was one of the principal resorts of literary talent. In 1889, another volume of verse, In the Garden of Dreams, confirmed her reputation as a poet. Of the poems in this volume, "In the Garden of Dreams," Meiklejohn affirmed that the perfect little gem, "Roses," was worthy of Goethe, and that "As I Sail" had the firmness and imaginativeness of Heine, the perfect simplicity containing magic. "Wordsworth never wrote a stronger line," he said of one in "Voices on the Wind." In "At the Wind's Will" again the same critic recognized the strong style of the 16th century, noble and daring rhythms, the "quintessence of passion," successes gained by the "courage of simplicity," rare specimens of compression as well as of sweetness. "The Gentle Ghost of Joy" he thought "a wonderful voluntary in the best style of Chopin." In a line of one of the sonnets, "Yet done with striving and foreclosed of care," he finds something as good as anything of Drayton's. He pronounced the two sonnets called "Great Love" worthy of a "place among Dante's and Petrarch's sonnets," and of the sonnet, "Were but my Spirit loosed upon the Air," he wrote, "It is one of the greatest and finest sonnets in the English language."

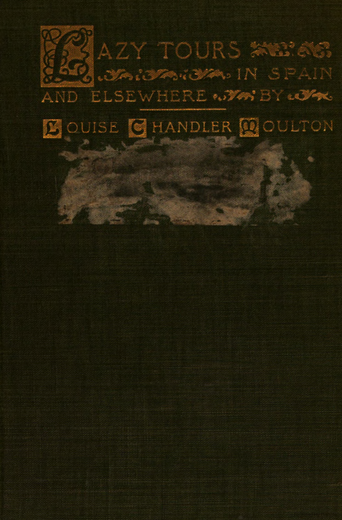
Lazy Tours in Spain and Elsewhere

She also wrote several volumes of prose fiction, including Miss Eyre from Boston and Other Stories, and some descriptions of travel, including Lazy Tours in Spain (1896). In this travel book she recounts her travels through Spain, Italy (Naples, Rome, Sorrento, Pompeii, Amalfi and Florence), France (Paris, Aix-les-Bains, Brides-les-Bains, and Savoy), Switzerland (Geneva, Lucerne, Chamouny and Ragatz), Germany (Nuremberg, Marienbad, Carlsbad, Frankfurt and Metz) and England (Yorkshire). In Spain she visited Irun, Burgos, Valladolid, Avila, El Escorial, Madrid, Toledo, Cordova, Granada and Seville.

She was well known for the extent of her literary influence, the result of a sympathetic personality combined with fine critical taste.

== Personal life ==
Her home in Boston, after her marriage, was soon a centre of attraction; and, surrounded by friends, she exercised there a gracious hospitality, and met the men and women who made the Boston of that epoch famous. Here was born her daughter, Florence, who later married William Schaefer, of South Carolina. Here her husband died, and here she remained through the days of her widowhood until the house became historic.

With the exception of the two years immediately following Mr. Moulton's death, when she remained at home and in seclusion, Moulton went abroad every summer. Every winter, she was back in Boston, where her house was a centre of literary life. She was the friend of Henry Wadsworth Longfellow and John Greenleaf Whittier and Oliver Wendell Holmes Sr. in their lifetime, the acquaintance of George Henry Boker, and Ralph Waldo Emerson, and James Russell Lowell, and John Boyle O'Reilly, and of Sarah Helen Whitman (the fiancée of Edgar Allan Poe), of Rose Terry Cooke and Nora Perry, of Stedman and Stoddard, Julia Ward Howe, Arlo Bates, Edward Everett Hale, William Dean Howells, William Winter, Anne Whitney, Alice Brown, Alicia Van Buren, and Louise Imogen Guiney. She was on pleasant terms with Sir Walter Besant, William Sharp, Dr. Horder, Mathilde Blind, Holman Hunt, Lucy Clifford, Rosa Campbell Praed, Coulson Kernahan, John Davidson, Kenneth Grahame, Richard Le Gallienne, Anthony Hope, Robert Smythe Hichens, William Watson, George Meredith, Thomas Hardy, and Alice Meynell, as well as Christina Rossetti, William Morris, Jean Ingelow, Louisa May Alcott, and William Black.

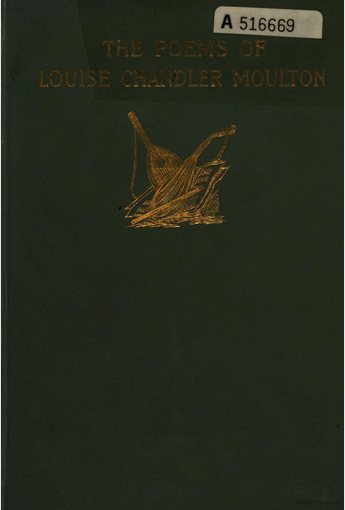
The Poems and Sonnets of Louise Chandler Moulton (1908)

After a lengthy illness, she died in Boston on August 10, 1908.

Lilian Whiting's biography (Louise Chandler Moulton, Poet and Friend. Illustrated. Boston: Little, Brown & Co., 1910) was direct and clear in its method, chronological and narrative rather than critical, compiled largely from the letters of Moulton and from the journal that was kept faithfully from age eight to the last days of failing health. With due acknowledgment of Moulton's gifts of personal charm and poetic sentiment and refinement, few discriminating readers ascribed to her verses that quality of genius. So it was considered unfortunate that Whiting began her biography with this word, as one of the implied characteristics of her subject. In her general treatment of Moulton's poetry, however, Whiting showed justice and reserve as well as sympathetic appreciation.
