= HMS Duncan =

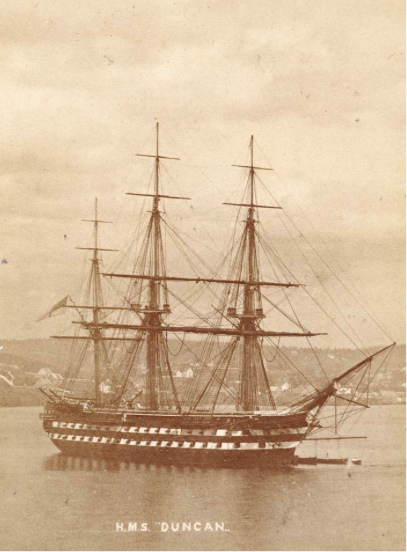
A photograph of the third ship to be named HMS Duncan, taken in Halifax, Nova Scotia

Seven Royal Navy ships have been named HMS Duncan, after Admiral Adam Duncan, 1st Viscount Duncan of Camperdown, hero of the Battle of Camperdown.

- HMS Duncan (1804) was the mercantile Carron, launched at Bombay Dockyard in 1792. She made three voyages from India to Britain for the British East India Company between 4 November 1795 and 17 June 1801. The Royal Navy purchased her in 1804 for service as a fifth rate and renamed her HMS Dover in 1807. She was wrecked off Madras in 1811.
- HMS Duncan (1811) was a 74-gun third-rate launched in 1811, reduced to harbour service in 1826, and broken up 1863.
- HMS Duncan (1859) was a 101-gun screw-propelled first-rate launched in 1859, employed on harbour service as HMS Pembroke in 1890, renamed HMS Tenedos in 1905, and sold in 1910.
- HMS Duncan (1901), launched in 1901, was a Duncan-class battleship that saw action against German installations on the Belgian coast in World War I and was sold in 1920.
- HMS Duncan (D99) was a D-class destroyer, launched in 1932 and scrapped in 1945.
- HMS Duncan (F80) was a Type 14 Blackwood-class frigate, launched in 1957 and in service from 1958 to 1985.
- HMS Duncan (D37) is a Type 45 destroyer launched on 11 October 2010.

== Battle honours ==
Ships named Duncan have earned the following battle honours:

- Spartivento, 1940
- Malta Convoys, 1941
- Mediterranean, 1941
- Atlantic, 1941–45
- Diego Suarez, 1942

== See also ==
- USS Duncan
