= USS Ellen (1853) =

Gunboat of the United States Navy

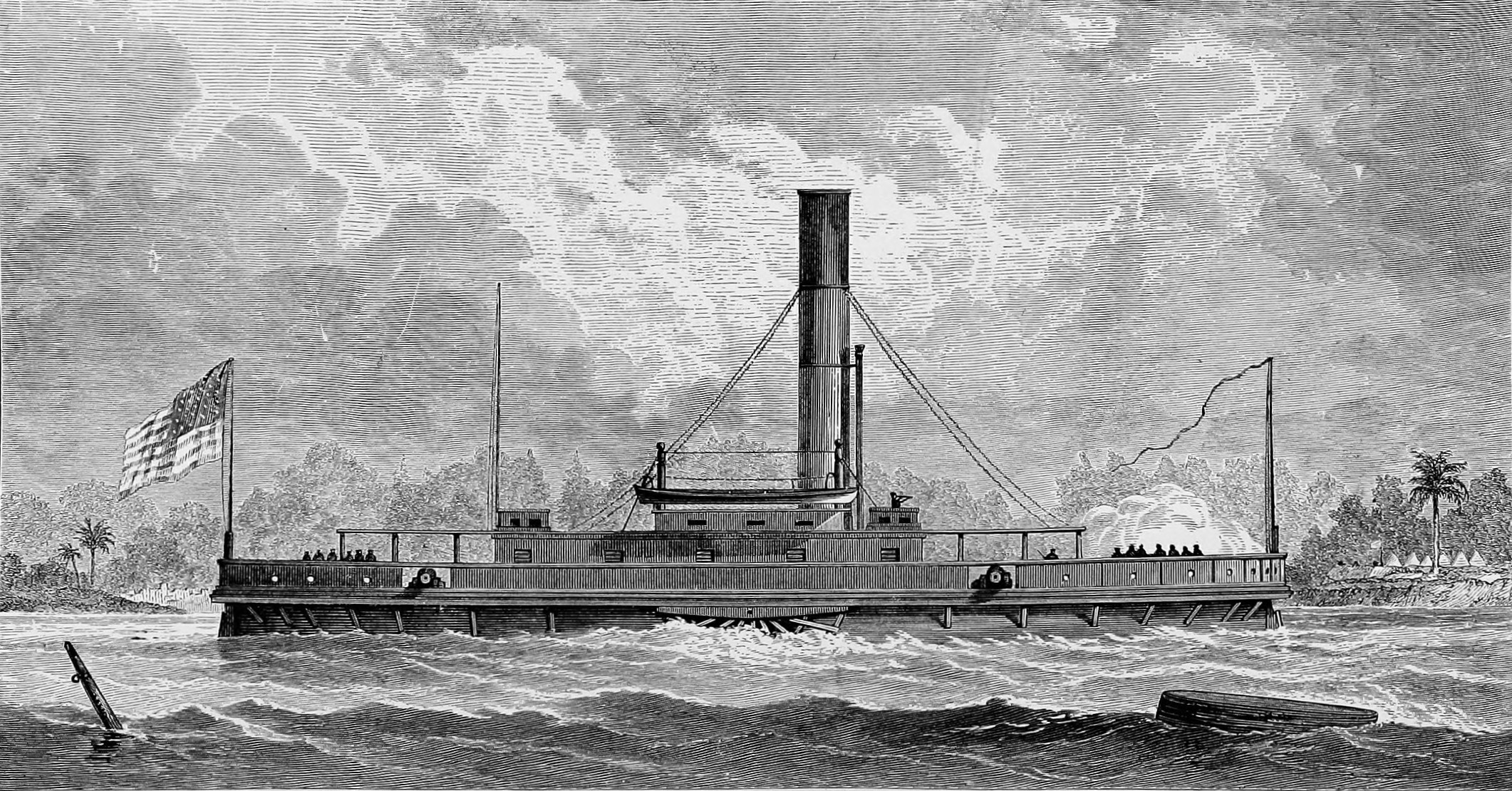
- USS Ellen in service as a gunboat, ca. 1861–62

History

United States
- Name: USS Ellen
- Launched: 1 February 1853
- Acquired: by purchase, 10 October 1861
- Commissioned: 16 October 1861
- Decommissioned: 30 October 1862
- Fate: Sold, 2 September 1865

General characteristics
- Type: Steam gunboat
- Displacement: 341 long tons (346 t)
- Length: 125 ft (38 m)
- Beam: 28 ft (8.5 m)
- Draft: 8 ft (2.4 m)
- Propulsion: Steam engine
- Complement: 50 officers and enlisted
- Armament: 2 × 32-pounder guns; 2 × 30-pounder rifles

The first USS Ellen was a side-wheel steam gunboat in the United States Navy during the American Civil War.

Ellen was built at New York City in 1853 as a civilian ferryboat, and purchased by the Navy on 10 October 1861 at New York; outfitted by New York Navy Yard; and commissioned 16 October 1861.

== Service history ==
Assigned to the South Atlantic Blockading Squadron, Ellen stood out on 18 October 1861 for Port Royal, South Carolina, arriving 14 November. Ellen exchanged fire with the enemy at Tybee Island on 24 December and on the 31st sailed to take part in the successful joint Army-Navy expedition against Port Royal Ferry on the Coosa River. During 26–29 January 1862 she reconnoitered Wilmington River and Wassaw Sound, Georgia, and engaged five ships under Commodore Josiah Tattnall III, CSN, near Savannah, damaging two of the Confederates.

Early in 1862 Ellen participated in an extensive combined expedition to take control of the seacoast of Georgia; by the middle of March Union ships from Port Royal had occupied the entire Georgia coast plus Fernandina, St. Augustine, and the St. Johns River in Florida. Discovered up the St. Johns River on 18 March was the famous racing yacht America, captured while in Union service, and later sunk by the Confederates to conceal her from invading Union forces. A week of hard work by Ottawa, Darlington, and Ellen raised her. On 26 March Ellen towed her to Port Royal, arriving 22 April.

On 28 May 1862 Ellen was sent up Folly Inlet to search for a floating battery believed mounted on a hulk. She did not find the battery but was able to report that Stono River was in complete possession of the Union forces. She engaged a short battery at Newton's Cut, South Carolina, and on 3 June joined E. B. Hale to attack a Confederate battery between Folly River and Light House Inlet. On 16 June she took part in an Army-Navy reconnaissance in the direction of Secessionville, South Carolina, target for an unsuccessful attack by the Army the day before. The remainder of her active service was in the Folly and Stono Rivers.

Ellen was decommissioned 30 October 1862, and used as a carpenter shop by the fleet at Port Royal until the war's end. She was sold 2 September 1865.
