= Dunkin =

Dunkin may refer to:

- Dunkin', also known as Dunkin' Donuts, American multinational quick service restaurant chain
- Dunkin (surname)

== See also ==
- Dunking (disambiguation)
