= Duncan Creek (Gasconade River tributary) =

Stream in Missouri, U.S.

Duncan Creek is a stream in southern Maries, northwestern Phelps and northeastern Pulaski counties in the Ozarks of the U.S. state of Missouri. It is a tributary of the Gasconade River.

The stream headwaters arise in Maries County approximately 2.5 miles northeast of Dixon on the east side of Missouri Route 28. The stream flows to the southeast through the northeast corner of Pulaski County and into Phelps County to enter the Gasconade about 4.5 miles north of Jerome and 4.5 miles southeast of its source area.

The source area is at 38°00′59″N 92°03′23″W at am elevation of approximately 1,025 ft (312 m). The confluence with the Gasconade is at 37°59′42″N 91°58′08″W at an elevation of 650 ft (200 m). Mungy Branch enters the south side of Duncan Creek about one half mile west of the confluence with the Gasconade.
