= Melancthon Brooks Woolsey =

United States Navy officer

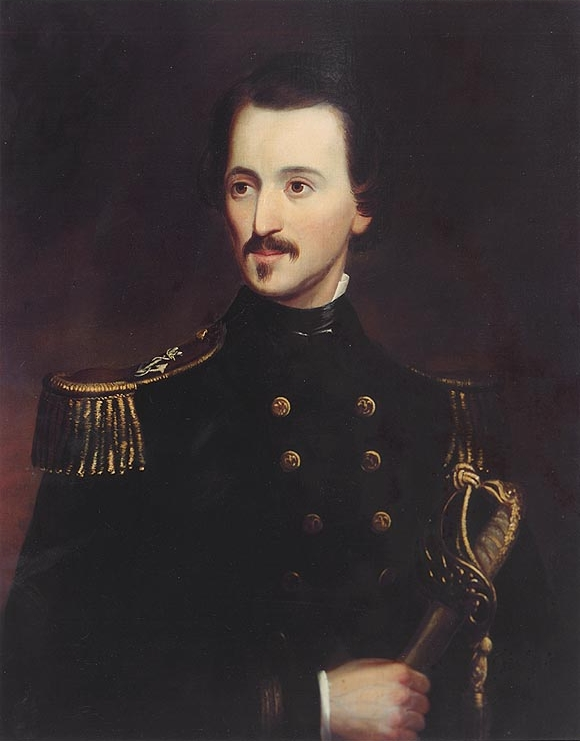
Portrait of Woolsey

Melancthon Brooks Woolsey (11 August 1817 – 2 October 1874) was an officer in the United States Navy during and after the American Civil War. He was commodore of the South Atlantic Station in the 1870s.

== Biography ==
Coat of Arms of Melancthon Brooks Woolsey

Woolsey was the first son of Commodore Melancthon Taylor Woolsey and Susan C. Treadwell; he was born at Sacketts Harbor, New York. His brother James Treadwell Woolsey was born about 1820. M.B. Woolsey entered the Navy as a midshipman on 24 September 1832. After duty at sea and a tour at the Naval School, Woolsey became a midshipman on 16 July 1840.

Woolsey was a descendant of George (Joris) Woolsey, one of the earliest settlers of New Amsterdam, and Thomas Cornell (settler)

He progressed through the rank of master to that of lieutenant by 1847. He was placed on the reserve list as lieutenant by the retiring board in September 1855. Lt. Woolsey was called back to active duty in 1861 as a result of the American Civil War.

Assigned initially to the receiving ship at New York, Woolsey assumed command of the steamer Ellen by late 1861 and began patrol duty with the South Atlantic Blockading Squadron. During that tour, his ship fought Confederate forces on three separate occasions. In May 1862, he engaged Fort Pemberton at Wapper Creek, South Carolina. On 1 June, his ship repelled a Confederate cavalry attack at Secessionville. Three days later, he commanded Ellen during the attack on James Island.

In July 1862, he was promoted to commander and placed in command of the sloop Vandalia. That duty lasted until early 1863, at which time he was transferred to command of the steamer Princess Royal. That ship was assigned to the West Gulf Blockading Squadron and patrolled the coasts of Louisiana and Texas. On 28 June 1863, Princess Royal helped to defend the town of Donaldsonville, Louisiana, against a determined Southern attack, and Comdr. Woolsey received high commendation from his superiors for his ship's contribution to the successful defense of the town. He remained with the blockade through the end of the war and, by July 1866, saw his name returned to the active list in the rank of captain.

Following the Civil War, Capt. Woolsey commanded the sloop-of-war Pawnee on the South Atlantic Station in 1867 and 1868. In 1869, he took command of the South Atlantic Station flagship Guerriere. In 1871, Woolsey was promoted to commodore, probably as flag officer in charge of the South Atlantic Station. His last tour of duty came in March 1873, when he took over as commandant of the navy yard at Pensacola, Florida.

Commodore Woolsey received orders detaching him from command of the navy yard in the summer of 1874. At the time, an epidemic of yellow fever raged at Pensacola, and he deemed it necessary to remain at his post to prevent panic. He contracted the highly infectious disease and died at Pensacola in the summer of 1874.

== Honors ==
- The first USS Woolsey (Destroyer No. 77) was named in honor of his father.
- The second USS Woolsey (DD-437) commemorated both him and his father.
