= Duncan River =

Duncan River may refer to:

== Canada ==
- Duncan River (British Columbia)
- Duncan River (rivière le Renne tributary), in Acton Regional County Municipality, Montérégie, Quebec

== New Zealand ==
- Duncan River (New Zealand), in the West Coast region of the South Island

== See also ==
- Duncan Creek (disambiguation)
- Duncan Lake (disambiguation)
