= Robert Dunkin =

Quaker businessman and a mentor (1761–1831)

- Born: 1761; Penzance, Cornwall, United Kingdom
- Died: 10 August 1831; Penzance
- Scientific career
- Fields: Electrochemistry

Robert Dunkin (1761–1831), of Penzance, Cornwall, was a Quaker businessman and a mentor of the young Humphry Davy, a founder of the science of electrochemistry, in the practice of experimental science.

== Death notice ==
According to a death notice in The West Briton 19 August 1831: "At Penzance on Thursday the 11th instant, Mr Dunking, [died] aged 70 years. – This most respectable man was a member of the Society of Friends; he was originally a saddler, which business he long carried on; but he was also an excellent mathematical instrument maker, and was well known to men of science by some valuable improvements in the barometer and the thermometer. He was an able mathematician, and in natural philosophy, especially in electricity and magnetism, he was deeply skilled – His amiable disposition, and the unassuming manners so well suited to his religious opinions, secured him the respect of all who knew him and will long endear his memory to his numerous friends."

Robert Dunkin died aged 70 at Penzance on 10 August 1831.

== Personal life ==
Robert Dunkin was the son of Robert and Anna Dunkin, born at Penzance and baptised on 14 July 1761. On 20 January 1786 Robert Dunkin and Celia Bonello, a widow, daughter of William and Elizabeth Odgers of Helston, were married, after the manner of Quakers. Their son, Robert, was born on 1 July 1787. Celia Dunkin was an active Quaker. She died, aged 76, on 21 January 1824.

== Dunkin's business ==
A trade card is on display at Penlee House, Penzance:

DUNKIN & JAMES/ SADDLE AND HARNESS/ Manufacturers/ PENZANCE/ PHILOSOPHICAL INSTRUMENTS/ Made and Repaired/THERMOMETERS, BAROMETERS, THEODOLITES, ANGLOMETERS, SHIPS COMPASSES &C/ ENGRAVED COPPERPLATE PRINTING/ MEDICAL ELECTRICITY &C

Pigot's Directory of Cornwall—1823 shows Robert Dunkin operating from Market Place, Penzance. Robert Dunkin is listed under "Tradesmen" as a saddlemaker in the Universal British Directory—1791.

== Dunkin as a Quaker ==
As his marriage took place after the manner of Friends, both partners must have been Quakers at this date (1786). He was listed as a member of Penzance Quaker Meeting, in a list written in 1828, his acquisition of membership being by "convincement". He published a religious poem "On God" in the Imperial Magazine in 1820.

== Dunkin and Davy ==
Humphry Davy's first biographer, John Ayrton Paris, was an unreliable witness, according to June Z. Fullmer. She contests the idea that Davy was a "country bumpkin", giving evidence that he and his family were of middling status in Penzance society: "Intimated always, in Paris's descriptive flights, were notes of snobbish disdain". Paris caricatures Dunkin as "Will Snaffle" in his roman a clef – Philosophy in sport made science in earnest (1827).

June Z. Fullmer says: "Instruction of Davy did not arise solely from his schooling and his apprenticeship. As important as anyone for his training was Robert Dunkin .... Dunkin has been variously referred to as saddler, ironmonger, patentee and mathematical instrument maker. These changing sobriquets reflect his versatility and technological expertise." ... "Perhaps the best testimony to Dunkin's ability derives from his activities. He received two patents, the first, in 1802, with Dr Henry Penneck as co-patentee, for the invention of 'Methods of improving Sailing and Navigation of certain ships and vessels'; the second, in 1813, for 'Methods of lessening the consumption of steam and fuel in working fire engines, and also methods for the improvement of certain instruments useful for mining and other purposes ' ".

Robert Hunt, in his article in Dictionary of National Biography (1888) on Davy, says: "....These conditions developed a love of poetry and the composition of verses and ballads. At the same time he acquired a taste for experimental science. This was mainly due to a member of the Society of Friends named Robert Dunkin, a saddler; a man of original mind and of the most varied acquirements. Dunkin constructed for himself an electrical machine, voltaic piles, and Leyden jars, and made models illustrative of the principles of mechanics. By the aid of these appliances he instructed Davy in the rudiments of science. As professor at the Royal Institution, Davy repeated many of the ingenious experiments which he had learned from his quaker instructor."

Harold Hartley in his Humphry Davy, discounted Ayrton Paris's tale (Life p. 31) about Davy's source of scientific instruments. Paris claimed that they were a gift from a French doctor, who had been shipwrecked off Land's End. " . . . any doubt about the veracity of Davy's statements about his apparatus has now been removed, as Dunkin's help must have been of the greatest assistance to him in those early days".

Davy's study of chemistry started in 1797 and his contact with Dunkin ceased when he moved to Bristol on 20 December 1798. Davy's initial contacts with Robert Dunkin may have been much earlier; they lived in the centre of the same town; Dunkin's son, also named Robert, was slightly older than Davy.

Fullmer cites the first documented contact was Davy's written attack on "The pretended inspiration of Quakers and other sectaries", the continuation of an oral debate. Dunkin is reported as having responded "I tell thee what, Humphry, thou art the most quibbling hand at a dispute as I ever met with in my life". The success of their chemical and electrical experiments must have been to some extent dependent in the skills of the Quaker instrument maker.
