= Dunking =

Dunking may refer to:

- Dunking (biscuit), dipping a biscuit or other food in a liquid
- Performing a slam dunk in basketball
- Dunking, a medieval punishment using a cucking stool
