= Justice Duncan =

Justice Duncan or Judge Duncan, may refer to:

- Laurence Ilsley Duncan (1906–1982), associate justice of the New Hampshire Supreme Court
- Rebecca Duncan (born 1971), associate justice of the Oregon Supreme Court
- Robert Morton Duncan (1927–2012), associate justice of the Ohio Supreme Court
- Warren W. Duncan (1857–1938), associate justice of the Illinois Supreme Court

== See also ==
- Benjamin Faneuil Dunkin, chief justice of the South Carolina Supreme Court
- Judge Duncan (disambiguation)
