= Duncan Township =

Duncan Township may refer to the following places in the United States:

- Duncan Township, Mercer County, Illinois
- Duncan Township, Michigan
- Duncan Township, Sullivan County, Missouri
- Duncan Township, Tioga County, Pennsylvania
