= Duncan Creek (Crooked Creek tributary) =

Stream in Monroe and Shelby County, Missouri, U.S.

Coordinates: 39.617816°N 92.048228°W

Duncan Creek is a stream in Monroe and Shelby counties in the U.S. state of Missouri. It is a tributary of Crooked Creek.

Duncan Creek has the name of William Duncan, original owner of the site.

== See also ==
- List of rivers of Missouri
