= Duncan Lake, Quebec =

Lake in Quebec, Canada

Duncan Lake
- Location within Quebec
- Location: Baie-James, Nord-du-Québec, Quebec
- Coordinates: 53.48°N 77.95°W
- Basin countries: Canada

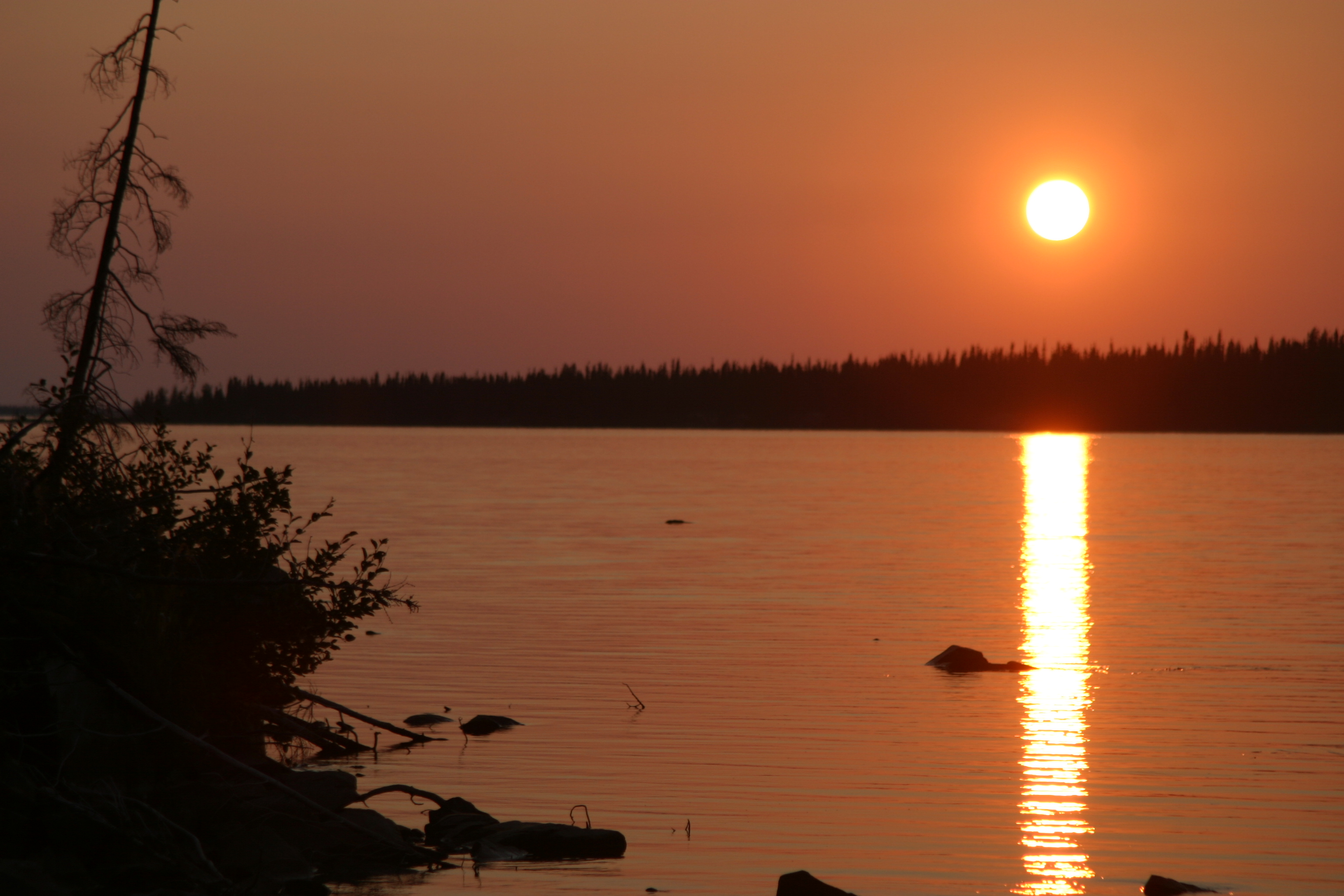
Photo of a sunset on Lake Duncan

Duncan Lake is a lake in western Quebec Canada.
