= Duncan, Casey County, Kentucky =

Duncan, Kentucky
- Unincorporated community
- Location within Kentucky
- Coordinates: 37°21′31″N 84°43′39″W
- Country: United States
- State: Kentucky
- County: Casey
- Elevation: 1,329 ft (405 m)
- Time zone: UTC-5 (Eastern (EST))
  - Summer (DST): UTC-4 (EDT)
- Area code: 606
- GNIS feature ID: 507889

Duncan is an unincorporated community in Casey County, Kentucky, United States. Duncan is located at the junction of Kentucky Route 501 and Kentucky Route 837 12 miles (19 km) east-northeast of Liberty.
