= Silas Duncan =

American naval officer (1788–1834)

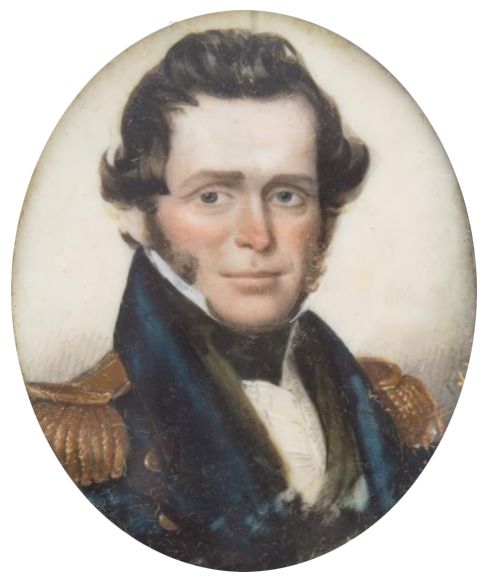
- Portrait by George Catlin
- Born: 1788; Rockaway Township, New Jersey, US
- Died: September 14, 1834 (aged 45–46); White Sulphur Springs, West Virginia, US
- Spouse: Martha Dandridge Aylett (m. 1831)
- Military career
- Allegiance: United States
- Branch: United States Navy
- Service years: 1809–1834
- Rank: Commander
- Commands: USS Lexington
- Conflicts: War of 1812; Battle of Lake Champlain (WIA); Falklands Expedition

Silas M. Duncan (1788 – September 14, 1834) was an officer in the United States Navy during the War of 1812.

== Biography ==
Born in Rockaway Township, New Jersey, Duncan was appointed midshipman on November 15, 1809. While third lieutenant of Saratoga during the Battle of Lake Champlain, on September 11, 1814, he was sent in a gig to order the gunboats to retire. He succeeded in delivering the orders despite concentrated enemy fire which severely wounded him and caused the loss of his right arm. For his gallant conduct he was thanked by Congress. From 1818 to 1824, Commander Duncan saw active service on board Independence, Hornet, Guerriere, Cyane, and Ferret.

On February 3, 1831, he married Martha Dandridge Aylett, granddaughter of American patriot Patrick Henry, third-youngest of six daughters from among the 13 children of Philip Aylett, of King William County, Virginia.

In 1831, he commanded the Lexington, which had been sent to reinforce the Brazil Squadron to protect American commerce, in part a response to Argentine proclamations on sealing and fishing in the South Atlantic. In July 1831, under orders from Luis Vernet (appointed Military and Civil Commander in the Falkland Islands by Buenos Aires), his deputy Matthew Brisbane seized the American vessels Superior, Breakwater and Harriet, charging them with sealing in the Falkland Islands in contravention of Vernet's regulations. The Breakwater escaped and the Superior was allowed to continue sealing on Vernet's terms. Vernet returned in the Harriet to Buenos Aires to arrange for a trial. After this seizure of American vessels the Lexington sailed for Port Louis to put an end to what was regarded by the US as a "nest of pirates". On December 31, 1831, the Lexington came to anchor off Port Louis, Brisbane and six others were arrested on charges of piracy, the guns of the settlement spiked and the powder magazine blown. Duncan also offered passage to any from the settlement that wished to leave, and the majority of the population took up this opportunity to leave the islands. The Lexington arrived in Montevideo on February 3, 1832, where those given passage were released, but Brisbane and six others remained as prisoners until April 16, when they were transferred to the USS Warren. Brisbane and the others were later released on the orders of Commodore Rodgers after the intervention of the British Chargé d'Affaires in Buenos Aires.

The incident caused a rupture in Argentine-US relations for many years, after Argentina expelled the US representative during the diplomatic row that followed. Although the log of the Lexington reports destruction of arms and a powder store, the remaining settlers later testified that there was great damage to private property. Towards the end of his life, Luis Vernet authorised his sons to claim on his behalf for his losses stemming from the raid. In the case lodged against the US Government for compensation, rejected by the US Government of President Cleveland in 1885, Vernet claimed that the settlement was destroyed.

On December 7, 1832, the ARA Sarandí whilst on patrol around the Falkland Islands, encountered the American sealer The Sun under the command of T.P.Trott. After firing on The Sun and boarding her, the captain was ordered to quit the Falklands. Trott returned to Montevideo and addressed the American legation there seeking protection from an American warship. In Montevideo, Trott was instructed to return to the islands and to ignore the warning, whilst the USS Lexington was prepared to return to the islands and if necessary seize the Sarandí. This second exhibition never took place, since during preparations the Sarandí was observed returning to Buenos Aires following the reassertion of British sovereignty over the Falkland Islands.

He died in 1834 at White Sulphur Springs, Virginia.

Three ships have been named USS Duncan for him.

== Bibliography ==
- Gurney, Alan (1 June 2008). "Matthew Brisbane". In David Tatham (ed.). The Dictionary of Falklands Biography (Including South Georgia): From Discovery Up to 1981. D. Tatham. pp. 115–119. ISBN 978-0-9558985-0-1.
- Mary Cawkell (2001). The History of the Falkland Islands. Anthony Nelson. ISBN 978-0-904614-55-8.
