= Exclusive economic zone of the United Kingdom =

Maritime boundary

The exclusive economic zones of the United Kingdom in blue, including the British Overseas Territories and the Crown Dependencies. The British claim in Antarctica is shown in shaded blue.

The United Kingdom's exclusive economic zone is the fifth largest in the world at 6,805,586 km^{2} (2,627,651 mi^{2}). It comprises the exclusive economic zones surrounding the United Kingdom, the Crown Dependencies, and the British Overseas Territories. The figure does not include the EEZ of the British Antarctic Territory.

The UK was late to establish an EEZ, relying on overlapping maritime zones for fisheries, pollution control, and energy matters. The Marine and Coastal Access Act 2009 gave the powers to establish an EEZ, with the zone defined by the Exclusive Economic Zone Order 2013 which came into force on 31 March 2014.

The United Kingdom has not claimed an EEZ extending from Gibraltar or Akrotiri and Dhekelia.

== Geography ==
While the outcrop of Rockall has territorial waters, it does not establish an EEZ by itself, instead falling within the EEZ of the rest of the UK.

The United Kingdom's EEZ in Europe is 773,676 km^{2} (298,718 mi^{2}). When including all crown dependencies and overseas territories it is 6,805,586 km^{2} (2,627,651 mi^{2}).

Areas of EEZs of the UK, crown dependencies and overseas territories
Territory	km^{2}	sq mi	Notes
United Kingdom	773,676	298,718	includes Rockall and the Isle of Man
Anguilla	92,178	35,590	
Ascension Island†	441,658	170,525	
Bermuda	450,370	173,890	
British Indian Ocean Territory	638,568	246,552	disputed with Mauritius
British Virgin Islands	80,117	30,933	
Cayman Islands	119,137	45,999	
Channel Islands	11,658	4,501	
Falkland Islands	550,872	212,693	disputed with Argentina
Gibraltar	426	164	disputed with Spain
Montserrat	7,582	2,927	
Pitcairn Island	836,108	322,823	
Saint Helena†	444,916	171,783	
South Georgia and the South Sandwich Islands	1,449,532	559,667	disputed with Argentina
Tristan da Cunha archipelago†	754,720	291,400	
Turks and Caicos Islands	154,068	59,486	
Total	6,805,586	2,627,651	

†Part of the overseas territory of Saint Helena, Ascension and Tristan da Cunha, which together has an EEZ of 1,641,294 square km.

== Legislation ==
=== Exclusive Economic Zone Order 2013 ===
Exclusive Economic Zone Order 2013
- Statutory Instrument
- Parliament of the United Kingdom
- Citation: SI 2013/3161
- Territorial extent: United Kingdom

Dates
- Made: 11 December 2013
- Laid before Parliament: 18 December 2013
- Commencement: 31 March 2014

Other legislation
- Made under: Marine and Coastal Access Act 2009; Energy Act 2004; Energy Act 2008

Status: Current legislation

Text of statute as originally enacted

The Exclusive Economic Zone Order 2013 (SI 2013/3161) is an order in Council of the Government of the United Kingdom, which defines the boundaries of the exclusive economic zone of the United Kingdom.

The order asserts a territorial sea of up to 200 nautical miles away from the coast of Great Britain and from the coast of Northern Ireland.

Before the order, the UK managed a de facto EEZ: the combination of the renewable energy zone, the marine pollution prevention zone and marine research. The UK negotiated individual borders of the EEZ with specific countries, bilaterally. This was standardised and rationalised by the Order through explicit boundaries, uniform across all purposes.

The order implements the United Nations Convention on the Law of the Sea (UNCLOS).

The order is made under the Marine and Coastal Access Act 2009.

The boundaries defined in the Order has been used to analyse maritime and coastal energy projections, varying from renewable energy, blue hydrogen and petroleum. The boundaries defined in the Order have been used to analyse disruption at UK ports.

In 2014, the Foreign and Commonwealth Office published a map showing the differences between the boundaries described by the Exclusive Economic Zone Order 2013 and the boundaries described by the Continental Shelf (Designation of Areas) Order 2013.

== Disputes ==
- The exclusive economic zones associated with the Falkland Islands, South Georgia and the South Sandwich Islands are disputed by Argentina.
- The EEZ of the Chagos Archipelago, also known as the British Indian Ocean Territory, is disputed by Mauritius, which considers the archipelago as a part of its territory.
- Gibraltar is disputed by Spain.
- Since the approval of Brexit in 2020 there have been disputes with the European Union about fishing rights in UK's territorial waters.
- The area around the uninhabited island Rockall is also disputed.

== See also ==
- Geography of the United Kingdom
- Exclusive economic zone of France
