= Falkland Islands sovereignty dispute =

Territorial dispute between Argentina and the United Kingdom

Location of the Falkland Islands (red and white), alongside the United Kingdom (white), with Argentina (beige) claiming them.

Timeline of de facto control of the Falkland Islands
April 1764 – February 1767	France
January 1765 – July 1770	Great Britain
February 1767 – February 1811	Spain
September 1771 – May 1774	Great Britain
February 1767 – February 1811	Spain
February 1811 – August 1829	None
August 1829 – December 1831	United Provinces of the Río de la Plata
December 1831 – January 1832	United States
January–December 1832	None
December 1832 – January 1833	Argentine Confederation
January–August 1833	United Kingdom
August 1833 – January 1834	None
January 1834 – April 1982	United Kingdom (Note: The United Kingdom was called the United Kingdom of Great Britain and Ireland until the Royal and Parliamentary Titles Act 1927, following Anglo-Irish Treaty in 1922. The current name United Kingdom of Great Britain and Northern Ireland has been in use since 1927.)
April–June 1982	Argentina
June 1982 – present	United Kingdom

Sovereignty over the Falkland Islands (Spanish: Islas Malvinas) is disputed by Argentina and the United Kingdom. The British claim to sovereignty dates from 1690, when they made the first recorded landing on the islands, and the United Kingdom has exercised de facto sovereignty over the archipelago almost continuously since 1833. Argentina bases its claim on its succession to Spanish sovereignty following its independence and views the British as a colonial power, as the latter sent naval forces to remove the Argentine authorities in January 1833 and took control of the islands afterward. The dispute escalated again in 1982, when Argentina invaded the islands, precipitating the Falklands War.

While Argentina claims a right to colonise the territory for economic gain, Britain has supported the right of self-determination of Falkland islanders. Today, Falkland Islanders overwhelmingly prefer to remain British. Following the British victory in the Falklands War, they were granted full British citizenship under the British Nationality (Falkland Islands) Act 1983. Argentina rejects the case for self-determination, as it views the islanders as "transplanted people" brought in by the British, ignoring the portion of the population with Argentinian origins and that there was no native people to begin with. Instead, Argentina argues that they do not have UN-recognised rights to self-determination, and instead argues for territorial integrity. Several South American countries and organizations support the Argentinian position, while the European Union recognizes the British administration. Most other countries do not take sides in the sovereignty dispute over the islands.

== Historical basis of the dispute ==
=== Pre-settlement claims ===
In 1493, Pope Alexander VI issued a Papal bull, Inter caetera, dividing the New World between Spain and Portugal. The following year, the Treaty of Tordesillas between those countries agreed that the dividing line between the two should be 370 leagues west of the Cape Verde Islands. The Falklands lie on the western (Spanish) side of this line.

There is some limited evidence resulting in speculation of a possible human presence on the islands predating European arrival. The British were the first to land on the Falklands, and did so in 1690, when Captain John Strong sailed through Falkland Sound, naming this passage of water after Anthony Cary, 5th Viscount of Falkland, the First Lord of the Admiralty at that time. The British were keen to settle the islands as they had the potential to be a strategic naval base for passage around Cape Horn.

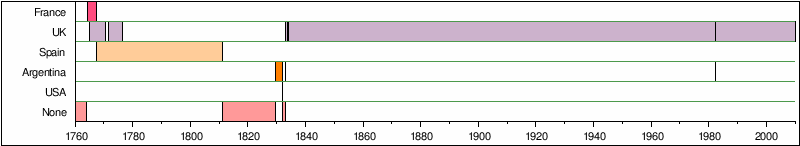
De facto control over the Falkland Islands

Spain made claims that the Falkland Islands were held under provisions in the 1713 Treaty of Utrecht, which defined the limits of the Spanish Empire in the Americas. However, the treaty only promised to restore the territories in the Americas held prior to the War of the Spanish Succession. The Falkland Islands were not held at the time, nor were they mentioned in the treaty.

=== Early settlements ===
France was the first country to establish a permanent settlement in the Falkland Islands, with the foundation of Port-Saint-Louis on East Falkland by French explorer Louis Antoine de Bougainville in 1764. Back in France, King Louis XV formally ratified possession of the islands on 12 September 1764. The French colony consisted of a small fort and some settlements with a population of around 250. The islands were named after the Breton port of Saint-Malo as the Îles Malouines, which remains the French name for the islands.

In 1765, Captain John Byron landed on Saunders Island. He then explored the coasts of the other islands and claimed the archipelago for Britain. The following year, Captain John MacBride returned to Saunders Island and constructed a fort named Port Egmont.

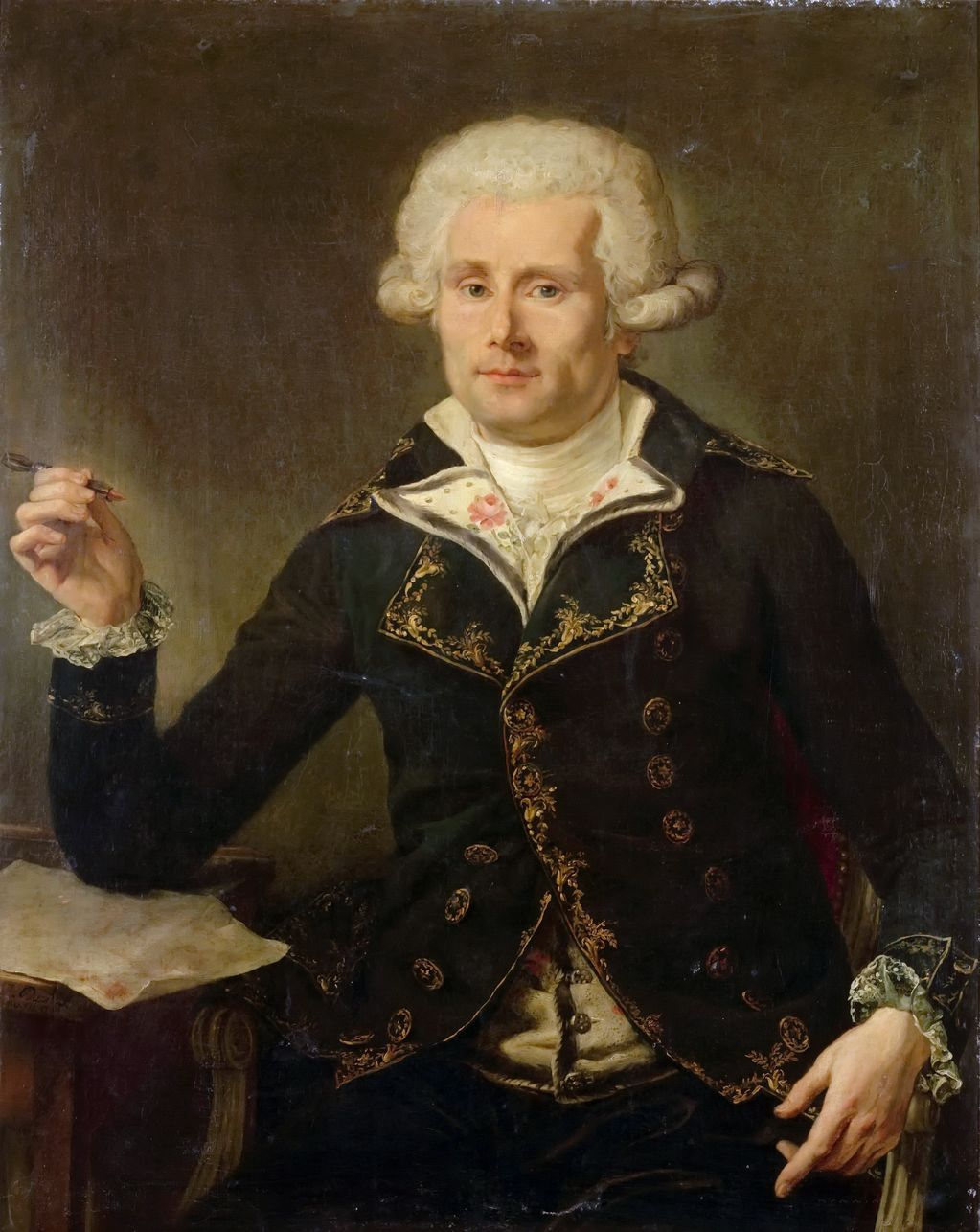
French nobleman, Louis Antoine de Bougainville

=== First sovereignty disputes ===
When Spain discovered the British and French colonies on the Islands, a diplomatic row broke out among the three claimants. In 1766, Spain and France, who were allies at the time, agreed that France would hand over Port Saint Louis, and Spain would reimburse de Bougainville and the Saint-Malo Company 618,108 French livres for the cost of the settlement. France insisted that Spain maintain the colony in Port-Louis to prevent Britain from claiming unilateral title to the Islands, and Spain agreed. Spain and Great Britain enjoyed uneasy relations at the time, and no corresponding agreement was reached.

The Spanish took control of Port Saint Louis and renamed it Puerto Soledad in 1767. On 10 June 1770, a Spanish expedition was sent to the British colony at Port Egmont. Facing a greater force, the British were expelled from Port Egmont, and Spain took de facto control of the Islands. The British threatened war over the issue, but both sides concluded a treaty on 22 January 1771, allowing the British to return to Port Egmont with neither side relinquishing sovereignty claims.

=== British and Spanish withdrawal ===
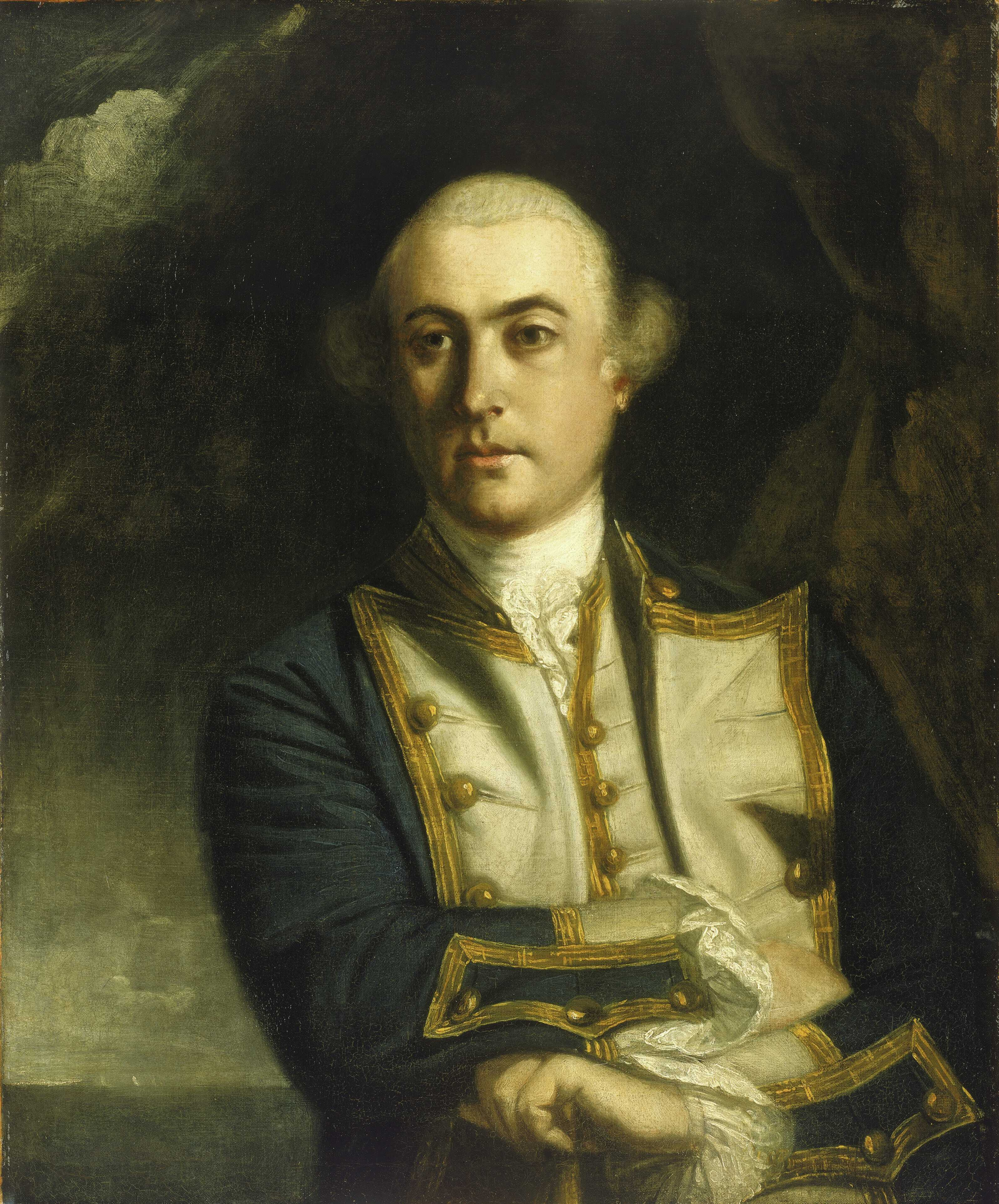
British Royal Naval Captain John Byron

However, in 1774, economic pressures leading up to the American Revolutionary War forced Great Britain to withdraw from the Falklands along with many of its other overseas settlements. They left behind a plaque and flag at Port Egmont asserting British sovereignty over the islands. This left Spain in de facto control, with the British maintaining they had the rights to return at any time. In 1777, Governor Ramon de Carassa was ordered to destroy the remains at Port Egmont. The British plaque was removed and sent to Buenos Aires. Spain ruled the islands from 1774 until 1811 from Port Soledad as part of the Viceroyalty of the Río de la Plata. In this period, 18 Spanish governors were appointed to rule the islands. Spanish troops remained until 1811, when Governor Pablo Guillen Martinez was called back to Montevideo as the revolutionary forces spread through the continent. As the Spanish government withdrew, he left behind a plaque claiming sovereignty for Spain.

This left no formal government present on the islands. Despite the lack of administration or governance, they retained human activity. British and American sealers routinely used them to hunt for seals, also taking on fresh water as well as feral cattle, pigs and even penguins for provisions. Whalers also used the islands to shelter from the South Atlantic weather and to take on fresh provisions.

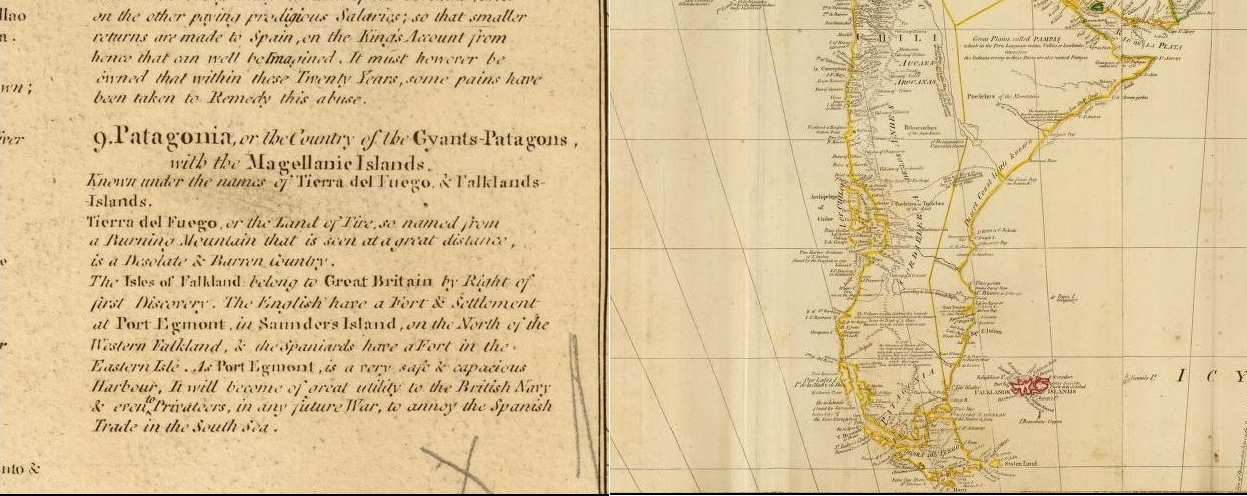
A map from a world atlas published in 1794 complete with marginal notes describing sovereignty: the Falklands belonged "to Great Britain by right of first discovery", the British had "a fort and settlement" on "the North of Western Falkland", while Spaniards "had a fort in the Eastern Isle".

=== Colonel Jewett's declaration ===
Argentina declared its independence from Spain in 1816, although this was not then recognised by any of the major powers. In 1823, Britain appointed Woodbine Parish as consul-general to Buenos Aires and concluded a friendly treaty with the government of the United Provinces of the Río de la Plata on 2 February 1825, but, like the US, did not recognise the full extent of the territory claimed by the new state.

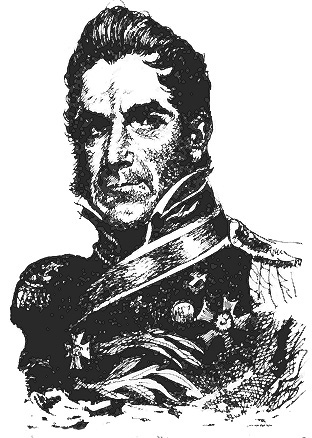
American privateer, Colonel Jewett

In October 1820, the frigate Heroína, under the command of American privateer Colonel David Jewett, arrived in Puerto Soledad after an eight-month voyage and with most of her crew incapacitated by scurvy and other disease. A storm had severely damaged the Heroína and had sunk a Portuguese ship pirated by Jewett called the Carlota. The captain sought assistance from the British explorer James Weddell to put the ship into harbour. Weddell reported that only thirty seamen and forty soldiers out of a complement of 200 were fit for duty and that Jewett slept with pistols over his head following an attempted mutiny. On 6 November 1820, Jewett raised the flag of the United Provinces of the Río de la Plata (the nation that would become Argentina) and claimed possession of the islands for the new state. Weddell reported that the letter he received from Jewett read:

"Sir, I have the honour to inform you of the circumstance of my arrival at this port, commissioned by the supreme government of the United Provinces of South America to take possession of these islands in the name of the country to which they naturally appertain."

Many modern authors report this letter as the declaration issued by Jewett. Jewett's report to the government of Buenos Aires does not mention any claim to the Falkland Islands, and news of the claim reached Argentina by way of the United States and Europe in November 1821, over a year after the event.

Before the Treaty was signed in 1825, Parish had requested from Argentine Foreign Minister Bernardino Rivadavia a general account of Buenos Aires and the provinces of the Río de la Plata for reference. Written by Rivadavia's secretary, Ignacio Núñez, the published report did not mention the Falkland Islands.

=== United Provinces governance ===
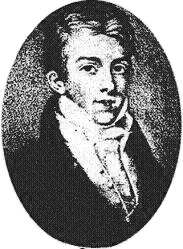
British minister chargé d'affaires, Sir Woodbine Parish

Subject to survey and demarcation of the property, the Government of Buenos Aires Province granted land on East Falkland to Jorge Pacheco in 1823, and fishing and hunting rights the following year. Pacheco was a businessman from Buenos Aires who owed money to the merchant Luis Vernet. A first expedition financed by Pacheco travelled to the islands the following year, arriving on the East Falkland on 2 February 1824. Its leader was Pablo Areguatí, who brought with him 25 gauchos. Ten days later Areguatí wrote to Pacheco to say the colony was perishing because the horses they had brought were too weak to be used. Thus, they could not capture wild cattle, and their only other means of subsistence was wild rabbits. On 7 June, Areguatí left the islands, taking with him 17 gauchos, with the remaining eight gauchos being rescued by the Susannah Anne, a British sealer, on 24 July. A second attempt, in 1826, sanctioned by the British (but delayed until winter by a Brazilian blockade), also failed after arrival in the islands.

After the failure, Pacheco agreed to sell his share to Vernet. The Buenos Aires government granted Vernet all of East Falkland, including all its resources, with exemption from taxation for 20 years, if a colony could be established within three years. Vernet visited the British consulate in 1826 seeking endorsement of his venture. The British acquiesced, and asked for a report on the islands. Vernet took settlers, including British Captain Matthew Brisbane, and before leaving once again sought permission from the British Consulate in Buenos Aires. He established a fledgling colony in 1828, and renamed Puerto Soledad to Puerto Luis. Vernet would visit the British consulate a third time in 1829, seeking continued endorsement of his venture and British protection for his settlement in the event of their returning to the islands. After receiving assurances from the British minister chargé d'affaires, Sir Woodbine Parish, Vernet provided regular reports to the British on the progress of his enterprise. He expressed the wish that, in the event of the British returning to the islands, the British Government would take his settlement under their protection; Parish duly passed this wish on to London. Islanders were born during this period, including Malvina María Vernet y Saez, Vernet's daughter.

The land grant on the islands later became the subject of compensation petition. In 1879, the heirs of Vernet requested an indemnity for the losses sustained on the islands. This petition was rejected by the Argentine Senate in 1882, following the approval of the Home Affairs Committee’s opinion, which claimed that Vernet’s land had been granted without right by the Government of Buenos Aires.

In 1829, he sought a naval vessel from the United Provinces to protect his colony. As none were available, the Buenos Aires government, headed by General Juan Galo de Lavalle, appointed him Military and Civil Commander, essentially the governor of the islands. This prompted British protests, as this was seen as an attempt by the United Provinces to exercise political and military control over the islands. Parish protested to Buenos Aires, which merely acknowledged the protest. Britain protested again when Vernet announced his intention to exercise exclusive rights over fishing and sealing in the islands. One of Vernet's first acts was to curb seal hunting on the islands to conserve the dwindling seal population. In response, the British consul at Buenos Aires protested the move and restated the claim of his government. Similar protests were received from the American representative, who protested at the curtailment of established rights and stated that the United States did not recognise the jurisdiction of the United Provinces over the islands. Despite the tension, Vernet continued to provide regular reports to Parish throughout this period.

=== Lexington raid and escalating chaos ===
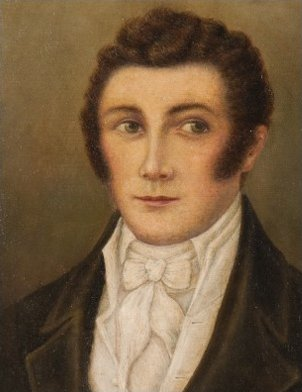
Luis Vernet, appointed by the Buenos Aires government as Military and Civil Commander of Falkland Islands and the Islands adjacent to Cape Horn in 1829

==== Vernet's actions ====
Vernet's attempts to regulate fishing and sealing led to conflict with the United States and the Lexington raid of 1831. Vernet seized three American ships, the Harriet, Superior and Breakwater, for disobeying his restrictions on seal hunting. The Breakwater escaped to raise the alarm and the Superior was allowed to continue its work for Vernet's benefit, but property on board the Harriet was seized and Vernet returned with it to Buenos Aires for the captain to stand trial. The American Consul in Argentina protested Vernet's actions and stated that the United States did not recognise Argentine sovereignty in the Falklands. The consul dispatched a warship, the USS Lexington, to Puerto Luis to retake the confiscated property.

Although the colony was successful enough to be advertising for new colonists at this time, a report by the captain of the Lexington suggests that the conditions on the islands were quite miserable as a result of the Harriet seizure and Lexington raid. The captain of the Lexington asserted in his report that he destroyed the settlement's powder store and spiked the guns, though Vernet later claimed that during the raid the Argentine settlement at Puerto Luis was also destroyed. Upon leaving to return to Montevideo, the captain of the Lexington declared the islands to be res nullius (nobody's property). Darwin's visit in 1833 confirmed the squalid conditions in the settlement, although Captain Matthew Brisbane, Vernet's deputy, later insisted that these were the result of the attack by the Lexington. Vernet had returned to Buenos Aires in 1831 before the attack and resigned as governor.

With the colony in disarray, Major Esteban Mestivier was appointed interim governor and tasked by the United Provinces with the establishment of a penal colony. He arrived at Puerto Luis with his family aboard the schooner Sarandí in October 1832. The Sarandí, under the command of its captain, José María Pinedo, then began to patrol the surrounding seas. Upon its return to Puerto Luis on 29 December 1832, the Sarandí found the colony in an uproar. In Pinedo's absence, there had been a mutiny led by a man named Gomila; Mestivier had been murdered and his wife raped. The captain of the French vessel Jean Jacques had meanwhile provided assistance, disarming and incarcerating the mutineers. Pinedo dispatched the mutineers to Buenos Aires with the British schooner Rapid. Gomila was condemned to exile, while seven other mutineers were executed.

==== American position ====
The American sealing vessels Harriet and Breakwater that had been seized by Vernet brought claims against their insurers and in 1839 these claims reached the Supreme Court of the United States in the case of Williams v. Suffolk Insurance Company. The insurers argued that Vernet was the legal governor of the Falkland Islands, the sealing was therefore illegal and so they ought not to have to pay. The ruling of the Supreme Court was:

The government of the United States having insisted, and continuing to insist, through its regular executive authority, that the Falkland Islands do not constitute any part of the dominions within the sovereignty of Buenos Ayres, and that the seal fishery at those islands is a trade free and lawful to the citizens of the United States, and beyond the competence of the Buenos Ayres government to regulate, prohibit, or punish, it is not competent for a circuit court of the United States to inquire into and ascertain by other evidence the title of the government of Buenos Ayres to the sovereignty of the Falkland Islands.

As the United States recognized the British and not the Argentine claim to the islands, the insurers had to pay.

==== British response ====
Mestivier's appointment again had drawn protests from the British consul in Buenos Aires, but these protests received no response from Buenos Aires, as the United Provinces were now asserting sovereignty over the islands. The appointments of Vernet and Mestivier convinced the British that direct rule was again necessary, and so the British dispatched a naval squadron to re-establish direct British rule.

=== British return and establishment of control ===
The British squadron to restore sovereignty arrived at Port Egmont on 20 December 1832, and reached Port Louis on 2 January 1833.

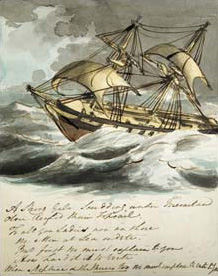
Sketch of a brig-sloop, probably HMS Clio, by Cmdr. William Farrington, c. 1812

Captain James Onslow, of the brig-sloop HMS Clio, arrived at the Spanish settlement at Port Louis to request that the Argentine flag be replaced with the British one, and that the Argentine administration leave the islands. Pinedo asked if war had been declared between Argentina and the United Kingdom; Onslow replied that it had not. While Pinedo wanted to resist, his numerical disadvantage was obvious, particularly as a large number of his crew were British mercenaries who were unwilling to fight their own countrymen. Such a situation was not unusual in the newly independent states in Latin America, where land forces were strong, but navies were frequently quite undermanned. He protested verbally, but departed without a fight on 5 January under protest, with the Argentine flag being lowered by British officers and delivered to him. The islands have remained under British rule ever since, except for the brief interruption caused by the Falklands War. Back on the mainland, Pinedo faced court martial; he was suspended for four months and transferred to the army, though he was recalled to the navy in 1845.

After their return, the British did not attempt to develop the islands as a colony. Initially, plans were based upon the settlers remaining in Puerto Luis, supported by the annual visit of a warship. Vernet's deputy, Matthew Brisbane, returned in March 1833 aboard the sealer Rapid during the visit of HMS Beagle. He took charge of the settlement and was encouraged to further Vernet's business interests provided he did not seek to assert Argentine government authority. Argentines have claimed that the population of Puerto Luis was expelled after the British return, but historical records shows that only four members of the settlement chose to leave.

Following the Gaucho murders in August 1833, the Falklands were administered as a military outpost with the few remaining residents of Vernet's colony. The first British Resident, Lt Smith, was established in 1834. Under his administration and initiative, the settlement recovered and began to prosper. Lt Smith's commanding officer was not enthusiastic about Royal Navy officers engaged in encouraging commerce and rebuked Smith. Smith resigned and subsequent residents allowed the settlement to stagnate.

In Britain, the Reform Act 1832 had extended the vote to more British citizens, including members of the free-trade merchant class who saw economic opportunity in opening up markets in South America. The British Board of Trade saw establishing new colonies and trade with them as a way to expand manufacturing jobs. The Foreign and Colonial Offices agreed to take on the Falklands as one of these colonies, if only to prevent colonisation by others. In May 1840, a permanent colony was established in the Falklands. A British colonial administration was formed in 1842.

This was expanded in 1908, when in addition to South Georgia, claimed in 1775, and the South Shetland Islands, claimed in 1820, the UK unilaterally declared sovereignty over more Antarctic territory south of the Falklands, including the South Sandwich Islands, the South Orkney Islands and Graham Land, grouping them into the Falkland Islands Dependencies. Following the introduction of the Antarctic Treaty System in 1959, the Falkland Islands Dependencies were reduced to include just South Georgia and the South Sandwich Islands. Territory south of the 60th parallel was formed into a new dependency, the British Antarctic Territory, which overlaps claims by Argentina (Argentine Antarctica) and Chile (Antártica Chilena Province).

== British-Argentine relations pre-war ==
In 1841, General Juan Manuel de Rosas offered to relinquish any Argentine territorial claims in return for relief of debts owed to Barings Bank in the City of London. The British Government chose to ignore the offer. In 1850, the Arana-Southern Treaty, otherwise known as the Convention of Settlement, was ratified between the United Kingdom and Argentina. It has been argued by several authors on both sides of the dispute that Argentina tacitly gave up her claim by failing to mention it and ceasing to protest over the Falklands. The treaty, which did not mention the islands, agreed to restore "perfect relations of friendship" between the two countries. While Rosas attempted to make a reservation concerning the Falklands' dispute after signing the Treaty in 1849, British diplomat Henry Southern replied that the Treaty ended all differences between their signatories.

Diplomatic correspondence related to the Islands resumed in 1884, when British minister Sir Edmund Monson protested after a new map of the Argentine Republic, funded by a congressional vote, would include the Falkland Islands as Argentine national territory. Argentine Foreign Minister Francisco J. Ortiz replied that the map could not be regarded as official unless sanctioned by the Argentine government, while also asserting that sovereignty over the Falkland Islands remained a pending question between the two governments. Monson rejected this view, citing earlier British statements that the question had already been closed.

In 1888, Argentina made an offer to have the matter subject to arbitration, but this was rejected by the British Government. Other than the protest lodged in 1885, the British Government did not acknowledge any further protests by Argentina until the 1940s, although the official position of the Argentine Government is that "During the first half of the twentieth century, the successive Argentine governments made it standard practice to submit protests to the United Kingdom". The Argentine Government does not identify these annual protests, but authors such as Roberto Laver claim at least "27 sovereignty claims, both to Britain, domestically in Argentina and to international bodies". In international law, territorial claims are usually considered defunct if there is a gap of 50 years or more between protests over sovereignty.

Following World War II, the British Empire declined and many colonies gained their independence. Argentina saw this as an opportunity to push its case for gaining sovereignty over the Falkland Islands, and raised the issue in the United Nations, first stating its claim after joining the UN in 1945. Following this claim, the United Kingdom offered to take the dispute over the Falkland Islands Dependencies to mediation at the International Court of Justice in The Hague (1947, 1948 and 1955). On each occasion Argentina declined.

In 1965, the United Nations passed a resolution calling on the UK and Argentina to proceed with negotiations on finding a peaceful solution to the sovereignty question which would be "bearing in mind the provisions and objectives of the Charter of the United Nations and of General Assembly resolution 1514 (XV) and the interests of the population of the Falkland Islands (Malvinas)".

In 1976, the British Government commissioned a study on the future of the Falklands, which looked at the ability of the islands to sustain themselves, and the potential for economic development. The study was led by Lord Shackleton, son of the Antarctic explorer Ernest Shackleton. Shackleton's report found that contrary to popular belief, the Falkland Islands actually produced a surplus by its economic activities and was not dependent on British aid to survive. However, the report stressed the need for a political settlement if further economic growth was to be achieved, particularly from the exploitation of any natural resources in the water around the islands. Argentina reacted with fury to the study and refused to allow Lord Shackleton permission to travel to the islands from Argentina, forcing the British to send a Royal Navy ship to transport him to the islands. In response, Argentina severed diplomatic links with the UK. An Argentine naval vessel later fired upon the ship carrying Shackleton as he visited his father's grave in South Georgia.

A series of talks between the two nations took place over the next 17 years until 1981, but failed to reach a conclusion on sovereignty. Although the sovereignty discussions had some success in establishing economic and transport links between the Falklands and Argentina, there was no progress on the question of sovereignty of the islands.

After the two nations signed the Communications Agreement of 1971, whereby external communications would be provided to the Falkland Islands by Argentina, the Argentine Air Force broke the islands' airways isolation by opening an air route with an amphibious flight from Comodoro Rivadavia with Grumman HU-16B Albatross aircraft operated by LADE, Argentina's military airline. In 1972, after an Argentine request, the United Kingdom agreed to allow Argentina to construct a temporary air strip near Stanley. On 15 November 1972 a temporary runway was inaugurated with the first arrival of a Fokker F-27; subsequent flights arrived twice weekly. Flights were improved in 1978 with Fokker F-28 jets, after the completion of a permanent runway funded by the British Government. This service, the only air connection to the islands, was maintained until the 1982 war. Also YPF, which was then the Argentine national oil and gas company, was in charge of supplying the island regularly.

Whilst maintaining the British claim, the British Government considered a transfer of sovereignty less than two years before the outbreak of war. However, the British Government had limited room for manoeuvre owing to the strength of the Falkland Islands lobby in the Houses of Parliament. Any measure that the Foreign Office suggested on the sovereignty issue was loudly condemned by the islanders, who reiterated their determination to remain British. This led to the British Government maintaining a position that the right to self-determination of the islanders was paramount. But Argentina did not recognise the rights of the islanders and so negotiations on the sovereignty issue remained at a stalemate.

In 1966, a group of Argentine nationalists hijacked an Aerolineas Argentinas DC-4 and forced it to land in Port Stanley, in an unsuccessful attempt to seize the islands for Argentina.

In 1976, Argentina landed an expedition in Southern Thule, an island in the South Sandwich Islands which at that time was part of the Falkland Islands Dependency. The landing was reported in the UK only in 1978, although the British government issued a rejection of the notion of sending a force of Royal Marines to dismantle the Argentine base Corbeta Uruguay.

There was a more serious confrontation in 1977 when the Argentine Navy cut off the fuel supply to Port Stanley Airport and said they would no longer fly the Red Ensign in Falklands waters. (Traditionally ships in a foreign country's waters would fly the country's maritime flag as a courtesy.) The British Government suspected Argentina would attempt another expedition in the manner of its Southern Thule operation. James Callaghan, the British Prime Minister, ordered the dispatch of a nuclear submarine, HMS Dreadnought and the frigates HMS Alacrity and HMS Phoebe to the South Atlantic, with rules of engagement set in the event of a clash with the Argentine navy. The British even considered setting up an exclusion zone around the islands, but this was rejected in case it escalated matters. These events were not made public until the parliamentary debates in 1982 during the Falklands War.

== Falklands War ==
The Falklands War of 1982 was the largest and most severe armed conflict over the sovereignty of the islands. It started following the occupation of South Georgia by Argentine scrap merchants who included some Argentine Marines. The UK had reduced its presence in the islands by announcing the withdrawal of HMS Endurance, the Royal Navy's icebreaker ship and only permanent presence in the South Atlantic. The UK had also denied Falkland Islanders full British citizenship under the British Nationality Act 1981.

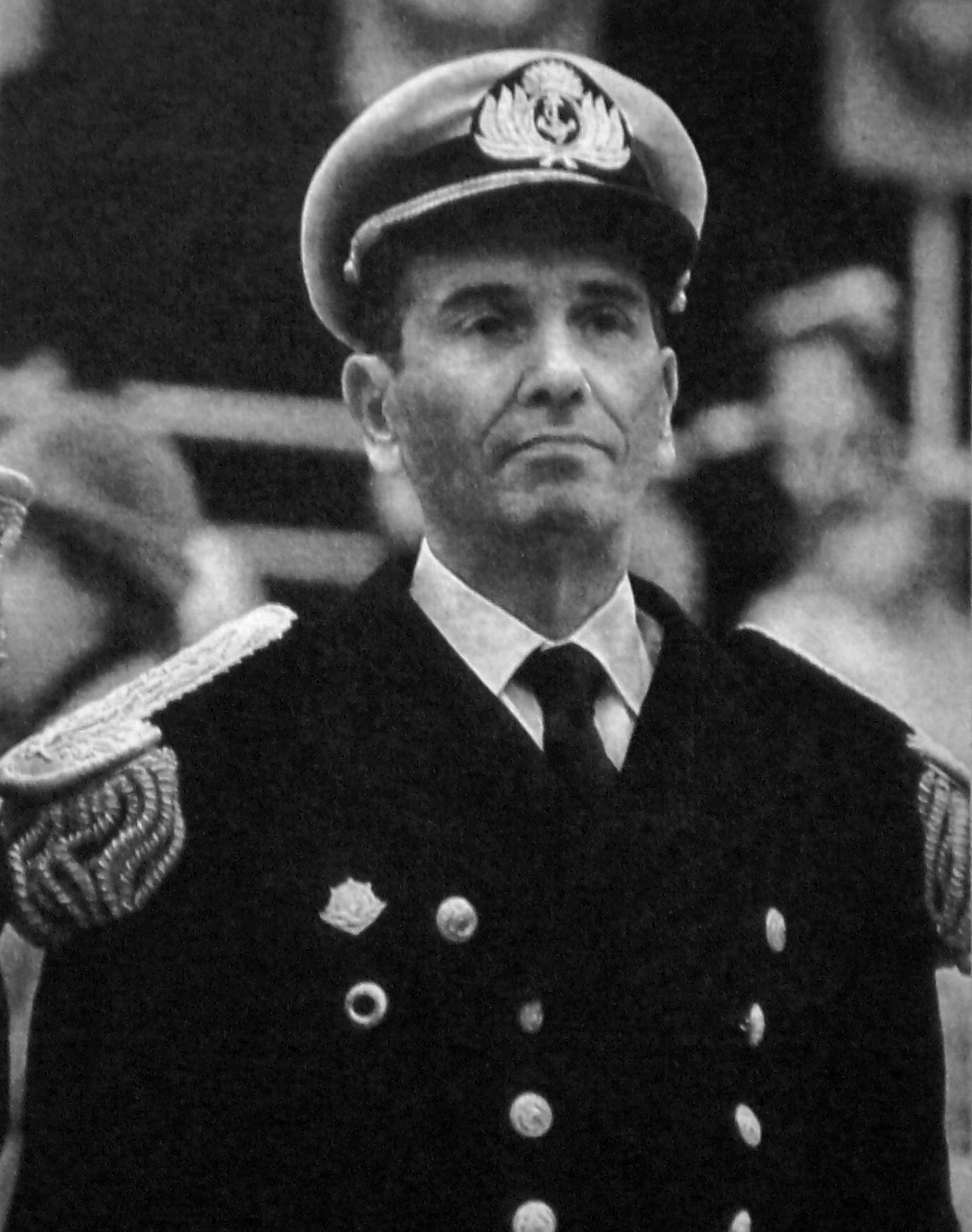
Commander-in-chief of the Argentine Navy, Admiral Jorge Anaya

In 1982, Argentina was in the midst of a devastating economic crisis and large-scale civil unrest against the repressive military junta that was governing the country. On 2 April, with Argentine Navy commander-in-chief Admiral Jorge Anaya as the main architect and supporter of the operation, a combined Argentine amphibious force invaded the Falklands. Immediately, the UK severed diplomatic ties with Argentina and began to assemble a task force to retake the islands. A diplomatic offensive began, to gain support for economic and military sanctions. The United Nations Security Council issued Resolution 502 calling on Argentina to withdraw forces from the Falklands and on both parties to seek a diplomatic solution. Another resolution called for an immediate ceasefire, but this was vetoed by both the United States and the United Kingdom. The European Community condemned the invasion and imposed economic sanctions on Argentina, although several EC states expressed reservations about British policy in this area. France and West Germany also temporarily suspended several military contracts with the Argentine military. The United States supported mediated talks, via Secretary of State Alexander Haig, and initially took a neutral stance, although in private substantial material aid was made available to the UK from the moment of invasion. The US publicly supported the UK's position following the failure of peace talks.

The British Task Force recaptured South Georgia on 25 April 1982 after a short naval engagement that began with offensive action against Argentina on 23 April. The operation to recover the Falklands began on 1 May and after fierce naval and air engagements an amphibious landing was made at San Carlos Bay on 21 May. On 14 June the Argentine forces surrendered and control of the islands returned to the UK. Two Royal Navy ships then sailed to the South Sandwich Islands and expelled the Argentine military from Thule Island, leaving no Argentine presence in the Falkland Islands Dependencies.

=== Post-war ===
Following the 1982 war, the British increased their presence in the Falkland Islands. RAF Mount Pleasant was constructed. This allowed fighter jets to be based on the islands and strengthened the UK's ability to reinforce the Falklands at short notice. The military garrison was substantially increased and a new garrison was established on South Georgia. The Royal Navy South Atlantic patrol was strengthened to include both HMS Endurance and a Falkland Islands guard ship.

As well as this military build-up, the UK also passed the British Nationality (Falkland Islands) Act 1983, which granted full British citizenship to the islanders. To show British commitment to the islands, high-profile British dignitaries visited the Falklands, including Margaret Thatcher, the Prince of Wales, and Princess Alexandra. The UK has also pursued links to the islands from Chile, which provided help to British Forces during the Falklands War. LATAM now provides a direct air link to Chile from Mount Pleasant.

In 1985, the Falkland Islands Dependencies, comprising at that time the island groups of South Georgia and the South Sandwich Islands, and Shag Rocks and Clerke Rocks, became a distinct British overseas territory – South Georgia and the South Sandwich Islands.

Under the 1985 constitution, the Falkland Islands Government (FIG) became a parliamentary representative democratic dependency, with the governor as head of government and representative of the monarch. Members of the FIG are democratically elected and the governor is effectively a figurehead. Theoretically, the governor has the power under the 2009 constitution to exercise executive authority; in practice he is obliged to consult the Executive Council in the exercise of his functions. The main responsibilities of the governor are external affairs and public services. Effectively under this constitution, the Falkland Islands are self-governing with the exception of foreign policy, although the FIG represents itself at the United Nations Special Committee on Decolonisation as the British Government no longer attends.

Relations between the UK and Argentina remained hostile after 1982 and diplomatic relations were restored in 1989. Although the United Nations General Assembly passed a resolution calling for the UK and Argentina to return to negotiations over the Falklands' future, the UK ruled out any further talks over the islands' sovereignty. The UK has also maintained controls on arms exports to Argentina, although these were relaxed in 1998.

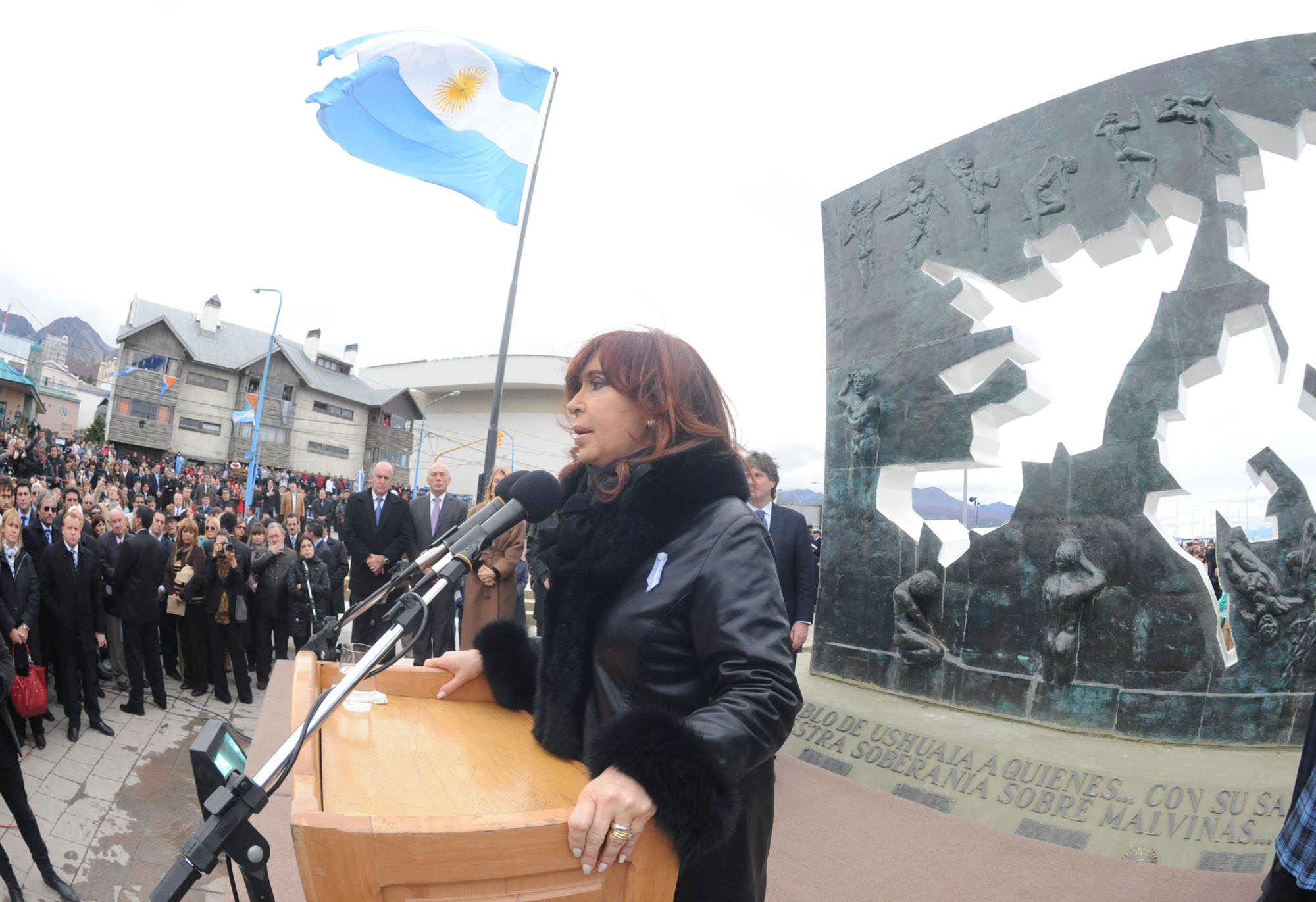
President Cristina Fernández de Kirchner speaks during a commemoration of the 30th anniversary of the Falklands War in Ushuaia, 2 April 2012

Relations between the UK and Argentina improved further in the 1990s. In 1998, Carlos Menem, the President of Argentina, visited London, where he reaffirmed his country's claims to the islands, although he stated that Argentina would use only peaceful means for their recovery. In 2001, Tony Blair, Prime Minister of the United Kingdom, visited Argentina and said he hoped the UK and Argentina could resolve their differences that led to the 1982 war. However, no talks on sovereignty took place during the visit, and Argentina's President Néstor Kirchner stated that he regarded gaining sovereignty over the islands as a "top priority" of his government.

Argentina renewed claims in June 2006, citing concern over fishing and petroleum rights; the UK changed from annually granting fishing concessions, to granting a 25-year concession. On 28 March 2009, UK Prime Minister Gordon Brown stated that there was "nothing to discuss" with Cristina Kirchner, the Argentine president, over sovereignty of the islands, when they met in Chile on his world tour prior to the 2009 G-20 London Summit. On 22 April 2009, Argentina presented to the UN a formal claim to an area of the continental shelf encompassing the Falklands, South Georgia and South Sandwich Islands, and parts of Antarctica, citing 11 years' worth of maritime survey data. The UK quickly protested these claims.

In February 2010, in response to British plans to begin drilling for oil, the Argentine government announced that ships travelling to the Falklands (as well as South Georgia and the South Sandwich Islands) would require a permit to use Argentine territorial waters. The British and Falkland governments stated that this announcement did not affect the waters surrounding the islands. Despite the new restrictions, Desire Petroleum began drilling for oil on 22 February 2010, about 54 nautical miles (100 km, 62 mi) north of the Falklands.

In 2011 the Mercosur bloc agreed to close ports to ships flying the Falkland Islands flags, whilst other British-flagged ships would continue to be allowed.

In March 2013 the Falkland Islanders voted overwhelmingly in a referendum for the territory to remain British. Argentina dismissed the referendum as a "publicity stunt" because they consider the Falkland Islanders to be an "implanted population" who have no right of self-determination over the disputed territory. The British Government urged Argentina and other countries to respect the islanders' wishes.

== Current claims ==
=== Argentina ===
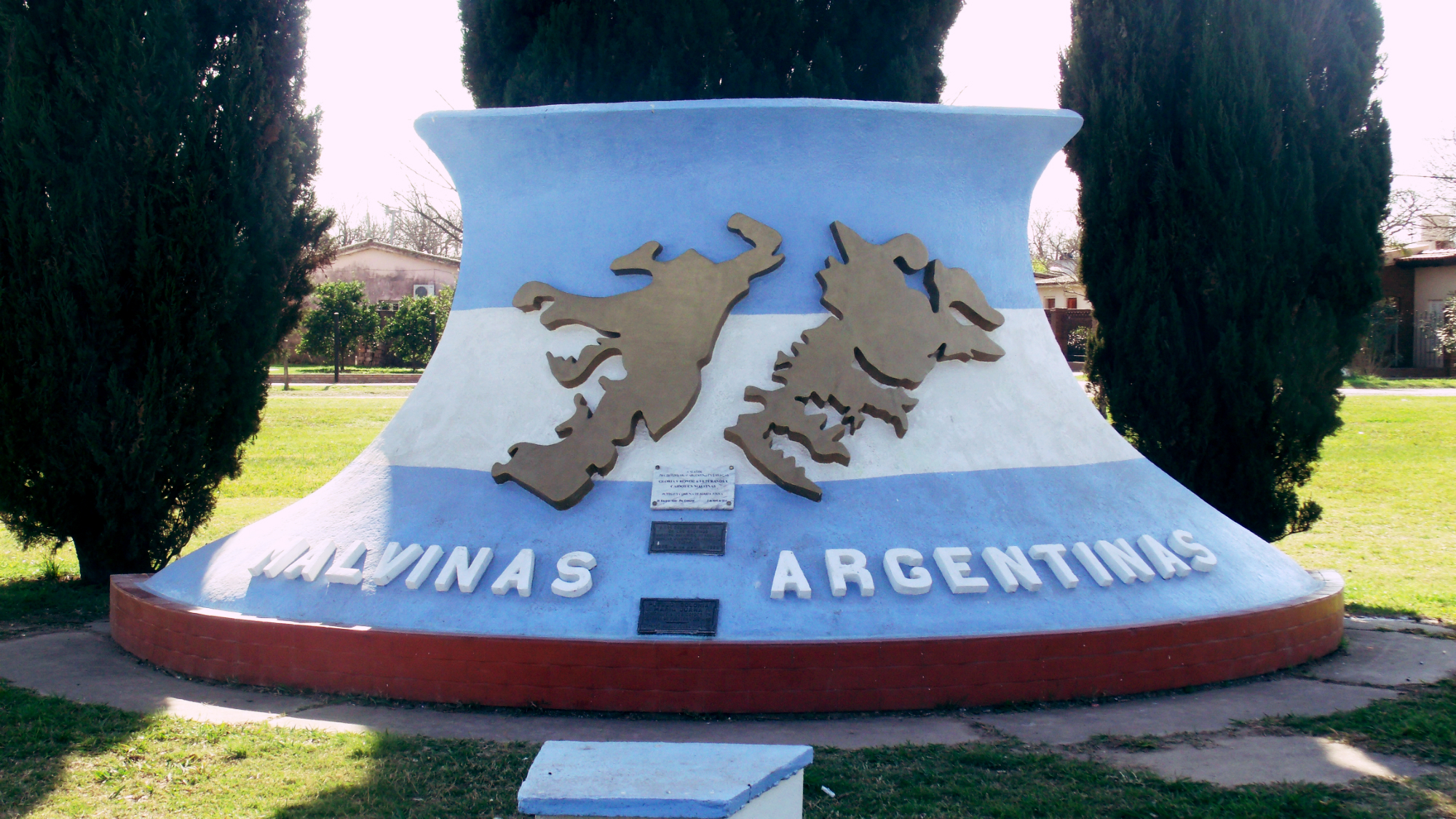
Falklands War memorial in Argentina, 2015

The Argentine government argues that it has maintained a claim over the Falkland Islands since 1833. It considers the archipelago part of the Tierra del Fuego Province, along with South Georgia and the South Sandwich Islands.

Supporters of the Argentine position make the following claims:

- That sovereignty of the islands was transferred to Argentina from Spain upon independence in 1816, a principle known as uti possidetis juris.
- That the British dropped their claim by acquiescence by not protesting the many years of peaceful and effective Spanish occupation, after the abandonment of Port Egmont.
- That, in addition to uti possidetis juris, sovereignty was obtained when the islands were formally claimed in Argentina's name in 1820, followed by Argentina's confirmation and effective occupation from 1826 to 1833.
- That the establishment of British de facto rule on the Falklands in 1833 (referred to as an "act of force" by Argentina) was illegal under international law, and this has been noted and protested by Argentina on 17 June 1833 and repeated in 1841, 1849, 1884, 1888, 1908, 1927, 1933, 1946, and yearly thereafter in the UN.
- That the principle of self-determination is not applicable to this sovereignty question because, as Argentina argues, the current inhabitants are a "transplanted population", of British character and nationality, brought to replace the Argentine population, not a distinct "people" as required by external self-determination doctrine.
- That self-determination is further rendered inapplicable due to the disruption of the territorial integrity of Argentina that began with a forceful removal of its authorities in the islands in 1833, thus there is a failure to comply with an explicit requirement of UN Resolution 1514 (XV).
- That the UN ratified this inapplicability of self-determination when the Assembly rejected proposals to condition sovereignty on the wishes of the islanders.
- That the islands are located on the continental shelf facing Argentina, which would give them a claim, as stated in the 1958 UN Convention on the Continental Shelf.
- That Great Britain was looking to extend its territories in the Americas as shown with the British invasions of the Río de la Plata years earlier.

==== The Nootka Sound Conventions ====
In 1789, both the United Kingdom and Spain attempted settlement in the Nootka Sound, on Vancouver Island. On 25 October 1790, these two kingdoms approved the Nootka Sound Convention. In a secret article, it was stated that this was conditional on no third party settling in the areas mentioned in article 6 of the treaty. The conventions were unilaterally repudiated by Spain in 1795 but implicitly revived by the Treaty of Madrid in 1814.

Article 4 reads:

His Britannic majesty engages to take the most effectual measure to prevent the navigation and fishery of his subjects, in the Pacific Ocean or in the South-Seas, from being made a pretext for illicit trade with the Spanish settlements; and, with this view, it is moreover expressly stipulated, that British subjects shall not navigate or carry on their fishery, in the said seas, within the space of ten sea-leagues from any part of the coasts already occupied by Spain.

Article 6 reads:

It is further agreed with respect to the eastern and western coasts of South America and the islands adjacent, that the respective subjects shall not form in the future any establishment on the parts of the coast situated to the south of the parts of the same coast and of the islands adjacent already occupied by Spain; it being understood that the said respective subjects shall retain the liberty of landing on the coasts and islands so situated for objects connected with their fishery and of erecting thereon huts and other temporary structures serving only those objects.

Whether or not this affected sovereignty over the islands is disputed. The British argue that the agreement did not affect the respective claims and only stipulated that neither party would make further establishments on the coasts or "adjacent" islands already held by Spain. Argentina argues that "the islands adjacent" includes the Falklands and that the UK renounced any claim by the agreements.

==== Constitution of Argentina ====
The Argentine claim is included in the transitional provisions of the Constitution of Argentina as amended in 1994:

The Argentine Nation ratifies its legitimate and non-prescribing sovereignty over the Malvinas, Georgias del Sur and Sandwich del Sur Islands and over the corresponding maritime and insular zones, as they are an integral part of the National territory. The recovery of these territories and the full exercise of sovereignty, respecting the way of life for its inhabitants and according to the principles of international law, constitute a permanent and unwavering goal of the Argentine people.

As part of its claim, Argentina places the Falklands in its Tierra del Fuego Province.

=== United Kingdom ===
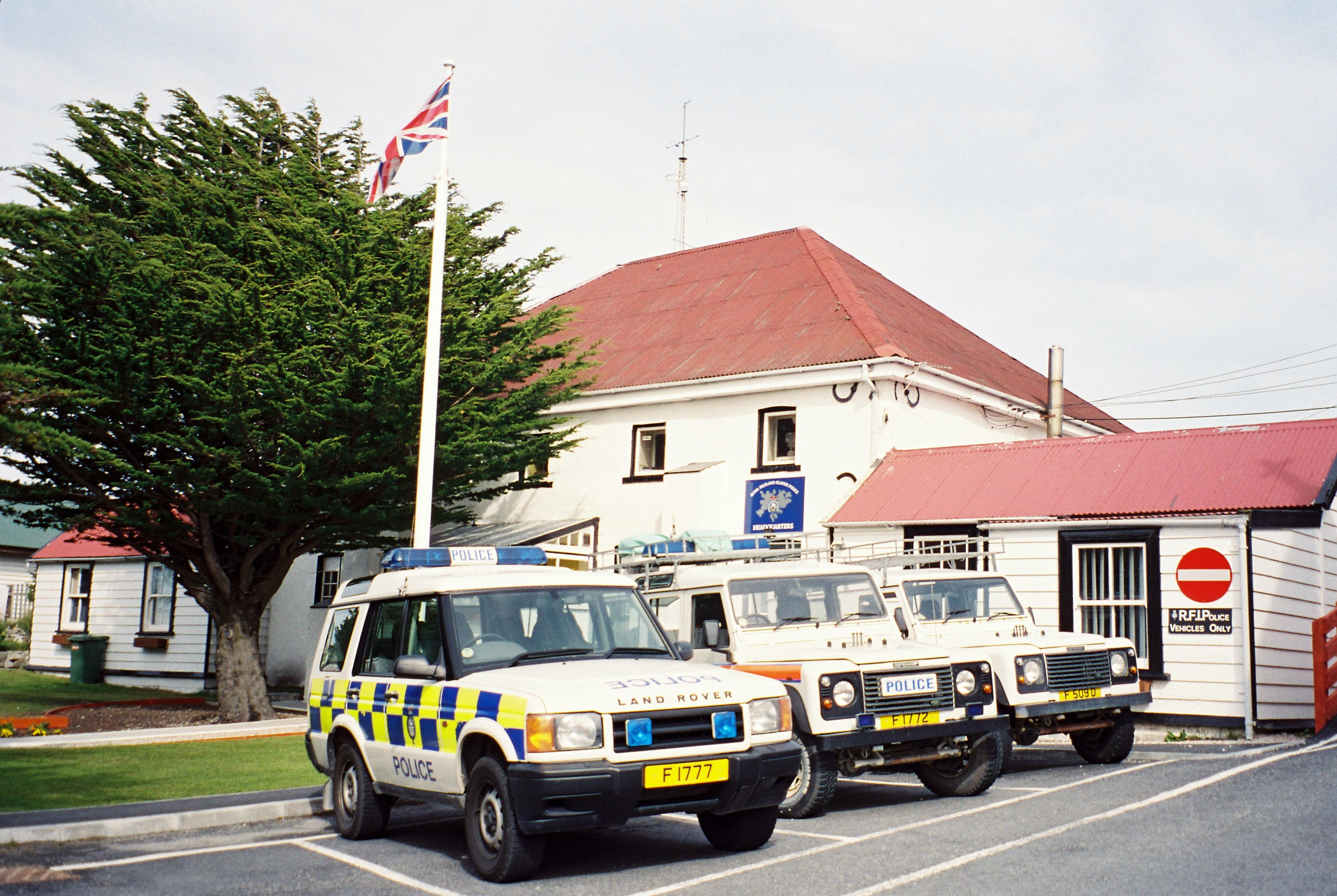
British style police

In 1964 the Argentine government raised the matter at the United Nations in a sub-committee of the Special Committee on the situation with regard to the implementation of the UN Declaration of the Granting of Independence to Colonial Countries and Peoples. In reply, the British Representative on the committee declared that the British Government held that the question of sovereignty over the islands was "not negotiable". Following a report by the Special Committee, UN General Assembly Resolution 2065 was passed on 16 December 1965. In its preamble it referred to the UN's "cherished aim to bring colonialism to an end everywhere", and invited both nations to proceed with negotiations to find a peaceful solution bearing in mind "the interests of the population of the Falkland Islands (Malvinas)".

In January 1966 the British Foreign Secretary, Michael Stewart, visited Buenos Aires when the Argentine claim to the islands was raised with him, following which, in July, a preliminary meeting was held in London, where the British delegation "formally rejected" the Argentine Ambassador's suggestion that the UK's occupation of the Islands was illegal.

On 2 December 1980, Nicholas Ridley, Minister of State at the Foreign and Commonwealth Office, stated in the House of Commons: "We have no doubt about our sovereignty over the Falkland Islands ... we have a perfectly valid title". The British government regards the right of the islanders to self-determination as "paramount" and rejects the idea of negotiations over sovereignty without the islanders' consent. Supporters of the British position argue:

- That self determination is a universal right enshrined in the UN charter, and applies in the case of the Falkland Islanders.
- That the 2013 referendum, in which 99.8% of Falklands voters voted to remain a British Overseas Territory on a 92% turnout, was an exercise in self-determination that "demonstrated beyond all doubt" the islanders' views on the dispute; and that the result should be respected by all other countries including Argentina.
- That the UK both claimed and settled the islands in 1765 before Argentina existed.
- That the 1771 Anglo-Spanish agreement preserved the claims of both Spain and Britain, not Spain alone.
- That the UK abandoned its settlement in 1774 due to economic pressures, but left a plaque behind proving sovereignty was not relinquished.
- That the Nootka Sound Convention only stipulated against further establishments and did not affect existing claims to sovereignty.
- That uti possidetis juris "is not a universally accepted principle of international law" and Argentina could not inherit the islands upon independence anyway as Spain did not have de facto control since 1811.
- That Argentina's attempts to colonise the islands were ineffectual and there was no indigenous or settled population before British settlement.
- That in 1833 an Argentine garrison was expelled but the civilian residents were encouraged to stay.
- That the islands have been continuously and peacefully occupied by the UK since 1833, with the exception of "2 months of illegal occupation" by Argentina.
- That the Arana-Southern Treaty of 1850 (the 'Convention of Settlement') ended all possible claims by Argentina on the Falkland Islands.
- That Argentine leaders indicated in the 1860s that there was no dispute between Argentina and the UK, and that Argentine maps printed between 1850 and 1884 did not show the islands as part of Argentina.
- That the UN Special Committee on Decolonization resolutions calling for negotiations "are flawed because they make no reference to the Islanders' right to choose their own future".
- The European Union Treaty of Lisbon ratifies that the Falkland Islands belong to the United Kingdom.

==== Falkland Islands Constitution ====
The Constitution of the Falkland Islands, which came into force on 1 January 2009, claims the right to self-determination, specifically mentioning political, economic, cultural, and other matters.

=== International and regional views ===
Argentina has regularly raised the issue in international forums and sought international support. South American countries have expressed support for the Argentine position and called for negotiations to restart at regional summits. The People's Republic of China has backed Argentina's sovereignty claim, reciprocating Argentina's support of the PRC claim to Taiwan, while the Republic of China on Taiwan (as of 2013) has acknowledged British sovereignty of the Falkland Islands. Although the Soviet Union abstained from UNSC 502, Russian president Vladimir Putin has since voiced sympathy for Argentina's position after former President of Argentina Cristina Fernández de Kirchner voiced criticism against countries which condemned the 2014 Crimean status referendum.

Since 1964, Argentina has lobbied its case at the Decolonization Committee of the UN, which annually recommends dialogue to resolve the dispute. The UN General Assembly has passed several resolutions on the issue. In 1988, the General Assembly reiterated a 1965 request that both countries negotiate a peaceful settlement to the dispute and respect the interests of the Falkland Islanders and the principles of UN GA resolution 1514.

The United States and the European Union recognise the de facto administration of the Falkland Islands and take no position over their sovereignty. In August 2026, The Daily Telegraph reported that United States defence officials had drawn up proposals under which Washington would withdraw recognition of British administration of the islands, as an incentive for the United Kingdom to meet the NATO target of spending 5 per cent of GDP on defence. Asked on 31 August whether he was reviewing the American position, President Donald Trump replied, "I always review every position; that is just one of many". The British government declined to comment. The islands were subject to EU law in some areas until 2020 when the UK left the EU. The Commonwealth of Nations listed the islands as a British Overseas Territory in their 2012 yearbook. The Falkland Islands have competed in nine editions of the Commonwealth Games since 1982. At OAS summits, Canada has continued to state its support for the islanders' right to self-determination.

Map of the Islands, with British names

Map of the Islands, with Argentine names

== See also ==
- Decolonization of the Americas
- 1986 Falkland Islands status referendum – Unofficial Falkland referendum
- 2013 Falkland Islands sovereignty referendum
- Argentine irredentism – Argentine claims over disputed territory
- East Patagonia, Tierra del Fuego and Strait of Magellan Dispute – Argentina-Chile sovereignty dispute between 1842 & 1881
- Sovereignty disputes of the United Kingdom
  - Chagos Archipelago sovereignty dispute – Dispute between Mauritius and the United Kingdom
  - Rockall Bank dispute – Conflicting maritime claims
  - South Georgia and the South Sandwich Islands sovereignty dispute – International dispute between Argentina and the UK
  - Status of Gibraltar – Political dispute in the Iberian Peninsula

== Sources ==
- Escudé, Carlos; Cisneros, Andrés, eds. (2000), Historia de las Relaciones Exteriores Argentinas (in Spanish), Buenos Aires: GEL/Nuevohacer under auspices of Argentine Council for International Relations (CARI), ISBN 950-694-546-2
- Chenette, Lt Cdr Richard D, USN (1987), The Argentine Seizure of the Malvinas (Falkland) Islands: History and Diplomacy, US Marine Corps Staff College Research Paper
- Destéfani, Laurio H. (1982), The Malvinas, the South Georgias and the South Sandwich Islands, the conflict with Britain, Buenos Aires: Edipress, ISBN 950-01-6904-5
- Fox, Robert (1992), Eyewitness Falklands, Mandarin, ISBN 0-7493-1215-7
- Greig, D.W (1983), "Sovereignty and the Falkland Islands Crisis" (PDF), Australian Year Book of International Law, vol. 8, pp. 20–70
- Hastings, Max; Jenkins, Simon (1997), The Battle for the Falklands, Pan, ISBN 0-330-35284-9
- Hope, Adrián F. J. "Sovereignty and decolonization of the Malvinas (Falkland) Islands." Boston College International and Comparative Law Review 6 (1983): 391+ online.
- Metford, J. C. J. "Falklands or Malvinas? The background to the dispute." International Affairs 44.3 (1968): 463–481. online
- Argentina. Congreso Nacional. Cámara de Senadores (1882). Diario de sesiones de la Cámara de Senadores (in Spanish). Buenos Aires – via HathiTrust Digital Library.
