= Argentine irredentism =

Argentine claims over disputed territory

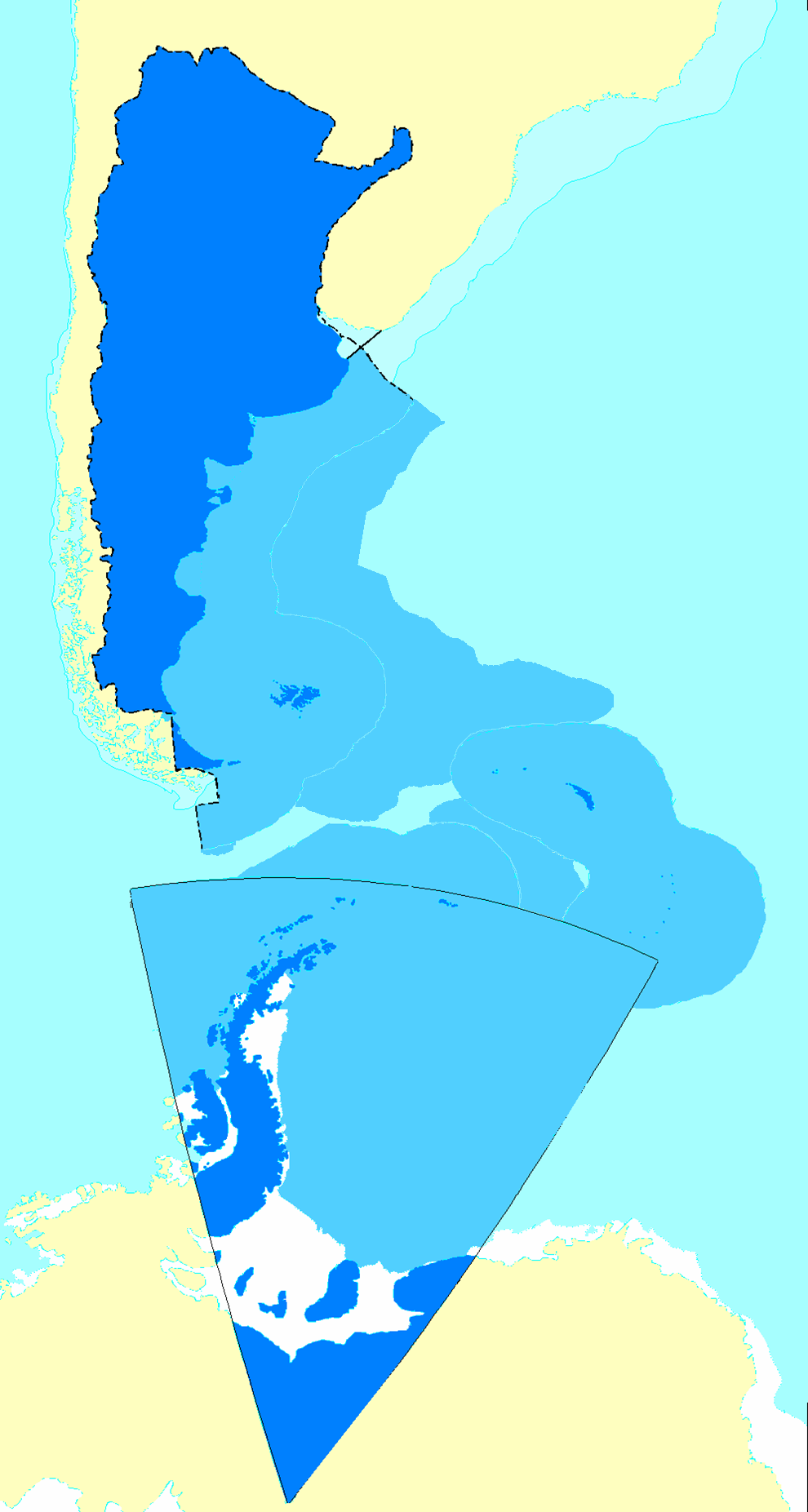
Argentina with all its territorial claims

Argentine irredentism refers to the idea that Argentina has suffered large territorial losses early in the 19th century to neighboring countries, and that it must strive to regain control of them, forming the "Greater Argentine Republic", envisioned with the same borders as the Viceroyalty of the Río de la Plata. This idea surged in popularity in the late 19th century, and peaked in influence in the late 1940s and early 1950s. All of these claims have been abandoned by Argentina, except for the Falkland Islands, South Georgia and the South Sandwich Islands.

It is also known as "nostalgic nationalism" and "territorial nationalism" (a term coined by former Argentine diplomat Carlos Escudé) to emphasize the fact that, unlike other forms of nationalism, it is not based on race, language, or culture, but geography and history.

== Origins and early contributors ==
"The idea of rebuilding the old Viceroyalty is a dream that all Argentines have sheltered in their youth..."

— Bartolomé Mitre, Argentine statesman, Diario La Nacion, Buenos Aires, October 28th 1880.

The territory of modern Argentina was once part of a Spanish colony, the Viceroyalty of the Río de la Plata, and its administrative capital was in Buenos Aires. Following the Spanish American wars of independence, this entity broke apart, and new independent states emerged: Argentina, Bolivia, Chile, Paraguay, Peru and Uruguay. Early Argentine statesmen such as Juan Manuel de Rosas, Juan Bautista Alberdi, Bartolomé Mitre and Domingo Faustino Sarmiento found the idea of trying to reunite these states interesting but unpractical, and never pursued it actively. Mitre, in particular, dismissed it a simple juvenile fantasy. The idea reappeared in academic and military circles in the late 19th century and quickly grew in popularity, due to the efforts of a small group of nationalist scholars.

=== Vicente Gregorio Quesada (1830–1913) ===
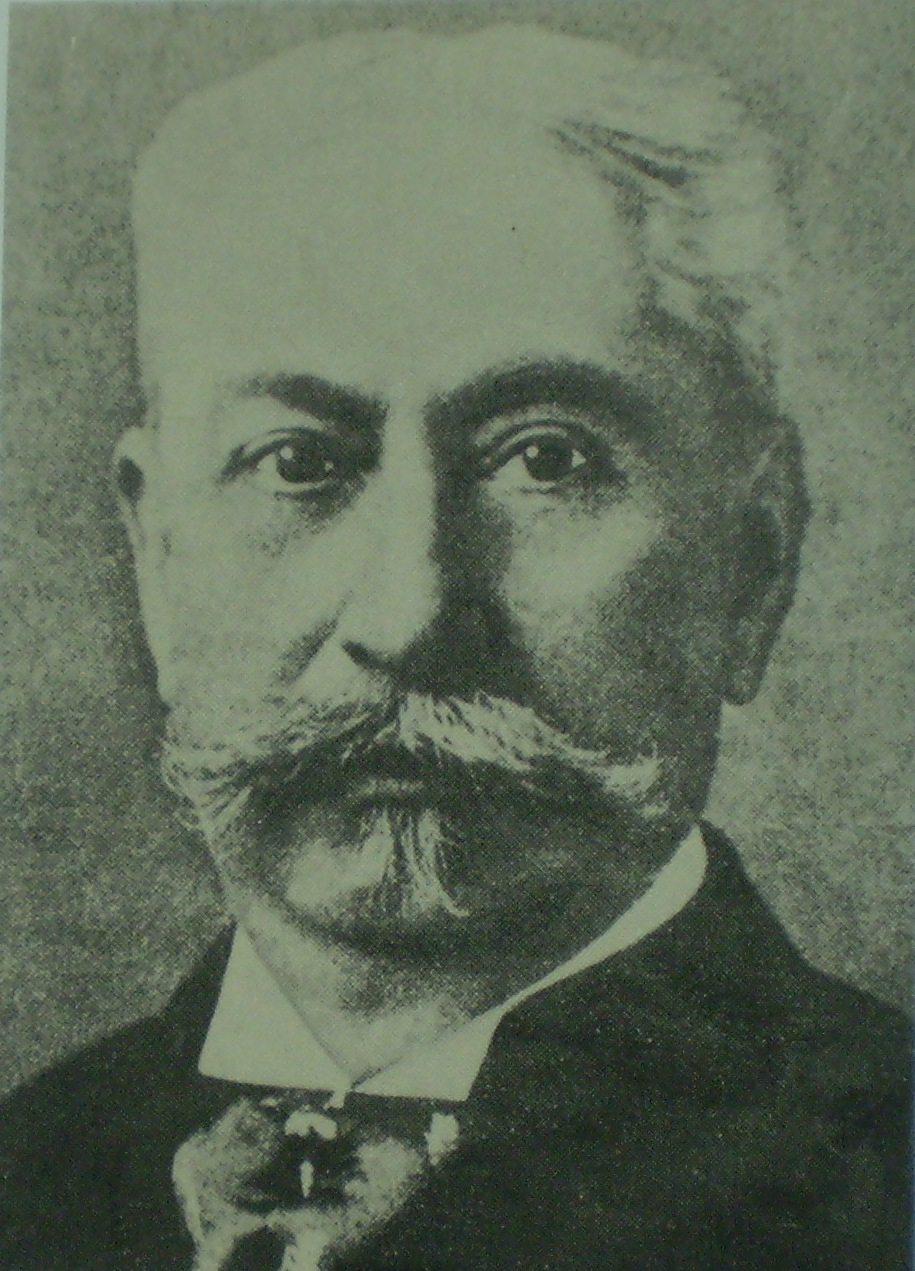
Vicente G. Quesada

Vicente Quesada was a lawyer, diplomat and congressman who held a number of positions in various Argentine administrations through his life, such as Minister of the Interior, Director of Argentina's National Library, and plenipotentiary ambassador in Spain. During the War of the Pacific, Quesada repeatedly asked Argentine President Nicolás Avellaneda to help Peru and Bolivia. President Avellaneda was committed to neutrality and firmly rejected these ideas, negotiating the Boundary Treaty of 1881 between Chile and Argentina, which Quesada called a "deplorable defeat" and "inadmissible territorial concession" A prolific writer, Quesada authored many books and articles about the history of Patagonia and why, according to him, the region should belong entirely to Argentina. He also regularly published his own magazine with the help of his son Ernesto, La Nueva Revista de Buenos Aires ("The New Magazine of Buenos Aires") that he used to promote his nationalist ideas. Quesada also wrote a book about the Falklands dispute, titled El archipielago de Malvinas o Islas Falklands – international conflicts.

Quesada saw the Viceroyalty of the River Plate as the "mold" in which Great Argentina should have been formed, and blamed foreign plots and "social liberalism" for the break up of the Viceroyalty. He also expressed concern over European immigration to Argentina, believing it would bring progress at the cost of extinguishing local Gaucho culture. His ideas were well received, and influenced many Argentine historians and politicians. Scholar Cavalieri believes Quesada might have been influenced by Pan-Germanism through his son Ernesto, who studied in Leipzig and Berlin, where he befriended German right-wing intellectuals.

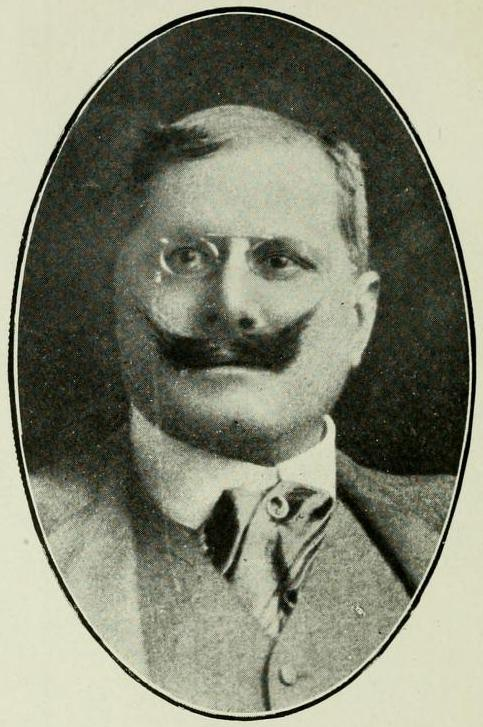
Ernesto A. Quesada

=== Ernesto Ángel Quesada (1858–1934) ===
Quesada's son, Ernesto, is considered to be the founder of Argentine historical revisionism, a nationalist school of thought within Argentine historiography that seeks to present dictator Juan Manuel de Rosas as a defender of Argentine sovereignty against foreign aggression A respected college professor, Ernesto published many books and newspaper articles expanding on his father's ideas, albeit in a much more bellicose tone. He constantly agitated for an alliance with Bolivia and war against Chile, which according to him, posed a threat to Argentina due to the positive influence German instructors had had on the development of their armed forces; these writings helped cement the idea that Argentina had lost large territories in the south and contributed to the emergence of anti-Chilean sentiments. He firmly opposed European immigration to Argentina and held antisemitic views. Later in life, he became an associate of German right-wing intellectual Oswald Spengler, and helped promote his ideas in Argentina

Through his writings and newspaper articles, Ernesto Quesada promoted nationalistic teachings in Argentine schools, believing this would help instill patriotic sentiments in the children of recently arrived immigrants. His ideas were very well received by nationalists.

=== José Juan Biedma (1864–1933) ===
Biedma was a veteran of the Conquest of the Desert who later became professor of history at the Colegio Militar de la Nación and the Escuela Naval Militar (Argentina) he also taught at Buenos Aires' School of Teachers, and was a member of the Argentina Geographic Institute. Between 1900 and 1903, the Ministry of Education invited him to help revise and propose modifications to study plans and school textbooks with the aim of instilling greater nationalist sentiments in the country's youth. He was a firm believer in Quesada's idea of a "Great Argentina" that had broken up in the early 1800s and that he hoped would one day be restored. He used his position as an educator to promote his nationalist views and the country's territorial claims. He authored a number of books about history to be used in schools, such as Historical Atlas of the Argentine Republic, and donated part of his wealth to the Navy, trying to assist in the purchase of new warships. The Historical Atlas featured a collection of maps showing a much larger Argentina, with access to the Pacific Ocean in the south, and controlling the entirety of Tierra del Fuego as well as the Magellan Strait and the Falkland Islands

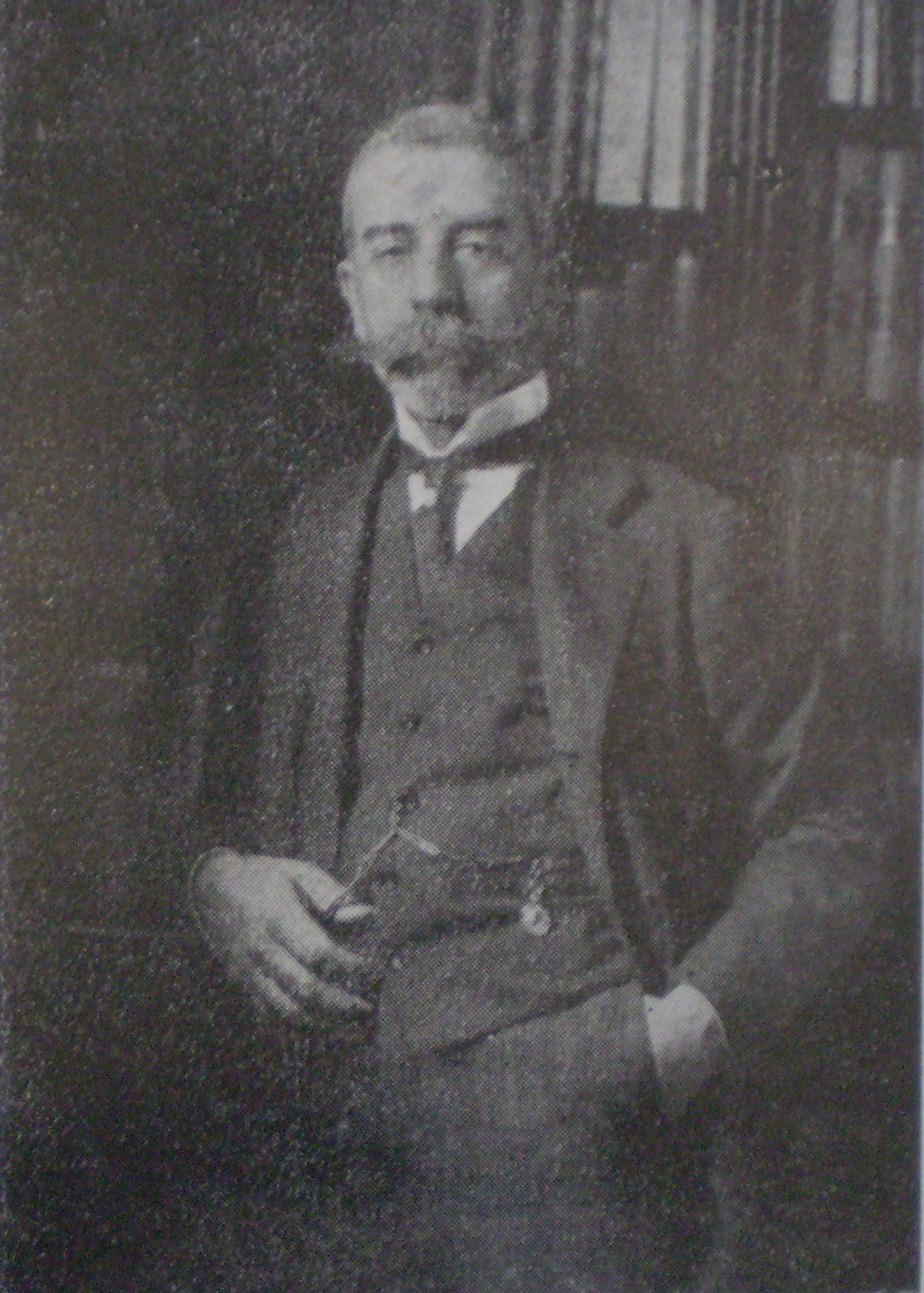
Joaquin V. Gonzalez

=== Joaquín Víctor González (1863–1923) ===
Joaquin Gonzalez was an Argentine lawyer and historian, who served in Julio Argentino Roca's second cabinet as Minister of the Interior. In his book The Trial of the Century, or One Hundred Years of Argentine History, published in 1910, he criticized Argentine diplomacy and foreign policy, claiming that from 1810 to 1910, the country had achieved nothing but defeats. He also claimed that countries like Chile, Peru and Uruguay owed their independence to Argentina, and that liberating them from colonial rule had been a mistake, arguing that Argentina had lost territories to these new nations, such as the Strait of Magellan to Chile. He also praised Argentina's expansion into Patagonia, but regarded it as a "mutilated victory", because the territorial unity of the Viceroyalty had not yet been achieved.

Gonzalez was one of the first Argentine politicians to promote the inclusion of "patriotic" content in school programs, with an emphasis on the country's territorial losses. He pursued an educational policy aimed at providing children with a "complete picture of the nation's territorial patrimony". This policy was put into place by José María Ramos Mejía a couple of years later.

Starting in 1910, Ramos Mejía introduced large reforms into Argentina's school system as part of his "Patriotic Education Program", promoting nationalist teachings and ideas, with the goal of integrating newly arrived immigrants and their children into the country. These reforms had the side effect of spreading Quesada's ideas about "Great Argentina" and convinced a new generation that the country had suffered large territorial losses at the beginning of the 19th century.

== Criticism ==
The ideas of Territorial Nationalism have been criticized by academics in modern times, who claim that this line of thinking has damaged Argentina's relationships with its neighbors, contributed to the country's isolation from the global economic system, and fostered intolerance and other extremist ideas within Argentine society. Furthermore, critics argue that the country never really controlled any of these claimed territories, and that therefore, suffered no territorial losses. Argentine irredentism is also unpopular in some of the lands claimed. The 2013 Falkland Islands sovereignty referendum saw the population vote overwhelmingly to stay as a UK overseas territory instead of joining Argentina.

== See also ==
- Argentine War of Independence – Secessionist civil war (1810–1825)
- Dissolution of the Viceroyalty of the Río de la Plata
- Falkland Islands sovereignty dispute – Territorial dispute between Argentina and the United Kingdom

== Bibliography ==
- Cavaleri, Paulo (2004). La restauración del Virreinato: orígenes del nacionalismo territorial Argentino (in Spanish). Buenos Aires: Universidad Nacional de Quilmes. ISBN 987-558-031-7.
- Eissa, S. G., & Pardo, B. (2022). Del tango por el territorio perdido al rock por el ganado: Formación territorial de la República Argentina. Perspectivas Revista De Ciencias Sociales
