= United Nations Security Council Resolution 505 =

UN Security Council Resolution 505
- Map of the Falkland Islands
- Date: 26 May 1982
- Meeting no.: 2,368
- Code: S/RES/505 (Document)
- Subject: Falkland Islands (Malvinas)
- Voting summary: 15 voted for; None voted against; None abstained
- Result: Adopted

Security Council composition
- Permanent members: China; France; Soviet Union; United Kingdom; United States
- Non-permanent members: Guyana; Ireland; Jordan; Japan; Panama; Poland; Spain; Togo; Uganda; Zaire

United Nations Security Council resolution 505, adopted unanimously on 26 May 1982, reaffirmed Resolution 502 (1982) and noted that the situation in the region of the Falkland Islands had seriously deteriorated. Also, appreciation was expressed for Secretary-General Javier Pérez de Cuéllar's efforts to bring about a peaceful solution to the conflict.

The resolution went on to urge both Argentina and the United Kingdom to co-operate with the Secretary-General to achieve a ceasefire and, if necessary, to arrange a possible dispatch of United Nations observers to the region to monitor the implementation of a ceasefire. The resolution concluded by requesting the Secretary-General to submit a report on developments no later than seven days after the implementation of the resolution.

Several days before the adoption of this resolution, Peru offered a peace proposal, which was rejected by Argentina. Argentina wished for Resolution 505 to include a reference to a possible interim administration on the islands, an idea that came up in negotiations but was not included in the final draft. A further draft resolution by Panama and Spain was vetoed by Britain and the United States.

== See also ==
- 1982 invasion of the Falkland Islands
- Argentina – United Kingdom relations
- Falklands War
- Invasion of South Georgia
- List of United Nations Security Council Resolutions 501 to 600 (1982–1987)
