= United Nations General Assembly Resolution 2065 (XX) =

UN General Assembly Resolution 2065
- Date: 16 December 1965
- Meeting no.: 1398
- Code: 2065 (XX) (Document)
- Subject: Falkland Islands sovereignty dispute
- Voting summary: 94 voted for; None voted against; 14 abstained
- Result: Adopted

The United Nations General Assembly Resolution 2065 was a non-binding resolution adopted on 16 December 1965 that recognized the existence of a sovereignty dispute between the United Kingdom and Argentina over the Falkland Islands.

Likewise, it acknowledged that the Falklands case constitutes a colonial situation that must be resolved taking into account what is expressed in resolution 1514 (XV), which established the objective of eliminating all forms of colonialism.

The resolution invites the parties to find a peaceful solution to the dispute.
