= List of statutory instruments of the United Kingdom, 2013 =

This is an incomplete list of statutory instruments made in the United Kingdom in the year 2013.

== Statutory instruments ==
=== 1–99 ===
- A55 Trunk Road (Conwy Tunnel, Conwy) (Temporary Traffic Restriction & Prohibitions) Order 2013 (SI 2013/1)
- A470 Trunk Road (Llanbrynmair, Powys) (Temporary Prohibition of Vehicles) Order 2013 (SI 2013/2)
- A4076 Trunk Road (South of Johnston, Pembrokeshire) (Temporary Traffic Restrictions & Prohibition) Order 2013 (SI 2013/3)
- Great Western Ambulance Service National Health Service Trust (Dissolution) Order 2013 (SI 2013/4)
- Tonnage Tax (Training Requirement) (Amendment) Regulations 2013 (SI 2013/5)
- Scotland Act 2012 (Commencement No. 3) Order 2013 (SI 2013/6)
- Scotland Act 2012 (Transitional and Consequential Provisions) Order 2013 (SI 2013/7)
- National Savings Bank (Amendment) Regulations 2013 (SI 2013/8)
- Criminal Legal Aid (General) Regulations 2013 (SI 2013/9)
- Energy Performance of Buildings (England and Wales) etc. (Amendment) Regulations 2013 (SI 2013/10)
- A4042 Trunk Road (Llanellen to Hardwick Gyratory, Abergavenny, Monmouthshire) (Temporary Traffic Restrictions and Prohibitions) Order 2013
- A48 and A466 Trunk Roads (High Beech Roundabout, Near Chepstow, Monmouthshire) (Temporary Traffic Restrictions and Prohibition) Order 2013
- Taxation of Chargeable Gains (Gilt-edged Securities) Order 2013
- A465 Trunk Road (Saltings Viaduct, Neath Interchange, Neath Port Talbot) (Temporary Prohibition of Vehicles) Order 2013
- Non-Domestic Rating (Small Business Rate Relief) (England) (Amendment) Order 2013
- A4232 Trunk Road (Culverhouse Cross to Capel Llanilltern, Cardiff) (Temporary Prohibition of Vehicles) Order 2013
- A4042 Trunk Road (Cwmbran Roundabout to Court Farm Roundabout, Torfaen) (Temporary Traffic Restrictions & Prohibition) Order 2013
- Children and Families (Wales) Measure 2010 (Commencement No. 6) Order 2013
- M4 Motorway (Junctions 16–17) (Temporary Restriction of Traffic) Order 2013
- M5 Motorway (Junctions 11A-12) (Temporary Restriction and Prohibition of Traffic) Order 2013
- A38 Trunk Road (Ivybridge, Devon) (Temporary Restriction and Prohibition of Traffic) Order 2013
- Driving Licences (Exchangeable Licences) (Amendment) Order 2013
- Plant Health (England) (Amendment) Order 2013
- Proceeds of Crime Act 2002 (Appeals Under Part 2) (Amendment) Order 2013
- A19 Trunk Road (Stockton Road Interchange to Portrack Interchange) (Temporary Prohibition of Traffic) Order 2013
- M1 Motorway (Junction 38 to Junction 39) (Temporary Restriction and Prohibition of Traffic) Order 2013
- M1 Motorway (Junction 36, Tankersley) (Temporary Restriction and Prohibition of Traffic) Order 2013
- A64 Trunk Road (Fulford Interchange) (Temporary Restriction and Prohibition of Traffic) Order 2013
- A1(M) Motorway (Junction 42 to Junction 43) (Temporary Restriction and Prohibition of Traffic) Order 2013
- A1(M) Motorway and the M62 Motorway (Holmfield Interchange) (Temporary Prohibition of Traffic) Order 2013
- M1 Motorway (Junction 42, Lofthouse) (Temporary Prohibition of Traffic) Order 2013
- A14 and A428 Trunk Roads (Junction 31 Girton Interchamge, Cambridgeshire) (Temporary Restriction and Prohibition of Traffic) Order 2013
- A47 Trunk Road (Oversley Lodge Roundabout to Knarr Fen Road, Thorney, City of Peterborough) (Temporary Restriction and Prohibition of Traffic) Order 2013
- A47 Trunk Road (Wisbech, Cambridgeshire to Terrington St John, Norfolk) (Temporary Restriction and Prohibition of Traffic) Order 2013
- A1 Trunk Road (Scotch Corner to Catterick) (Temporary Restriction and Prohibition of Traffic) Order 2013
- A1 Trunk Road (Leeming to Barton) (Temporary Restriction and Prohibition of Traffic) Order 2013
- A1 Trunk Road (Gateshead Quays Interchange) (Temporary Prohibition of Traffic) Order 2013
- Assured and Protected Tenancies (Lettings to Students) (Amendment) (England) Regulations 2013
- County Council of Somerset (Bridgwater & Taunton Canal Bridge) Scheme 2011 Confirmation Instrument 2013
- M11 Motorway (Junction 14 Girton Interchange) Northbound Exit Slip Road (Temporary Prohibition of Traffic) Order 2013
- Social Security (Information-sharing in relation to Welfare Services etc.) (Amendment) Regulations 2013
- A19 Trunk Road (Dudley Lane Interchange to Moor Farm Roundabout) (Temporary Restriction and Prohibition of Traffic) Order 2013
- A47 Trunk Road (Soke Parkway, Junction 17 Bretton Way Interchange to Junction 20 Paston Parkway Interchange, City of Peterborough) (Temporary Restriction and Prohibition of Traffic) Order 2013
- A30 Trunk Road (Newtown Roundabout, Longrock, Cornwall) (Temporary Restriction and Prohibition of Traffic) Order 2013
- A38 Trunk Road (Forder Valley to Manadon Road, Plymouth) (Temporary Prohibition of Traffic) Order 2013
- A38 Trunk Road (Buckfastleigh to Lee Mill, Devon) (Temporary Prohibition of Traffic) Order 2013
- M5 Motorway (Junction 25) (Temporary Restriction and Prohibition of Traffic) Order 2013
- A38 Trunk Road (Ivybridge to South Brent, Devon) (Temporary Restriction of Traffic) Order 2013
- M6 Motorway (Junctions 32–33, Northbound Carriageway) (Temporary Restriction of Traffic) Order 2013
- Gwynedd Council (Construction of Pont Briwet Road Bridge) Scheme 2011 Confirmation Instrument 2013
- Civil Enforcement of Parking Contraventions (County Borough of Vale of Glamorgan) Designation Order 2013
- Air Navigation (Restriction of Flying) (Jet Formation Display Teams) (RAF Cranwell) Regulations 2013
- Civil Enforcement of Parking Contraventions (County Borough of Bridgend) Designation Order 2013
- Air Navigation (Restriction of Flying) (Cheltenham Festival) Regulations 2013
- A66 Trunk Road (Walk Mill to Brough) (Temporary Restriction and Prohibition of Traffic) Order 2013
- M6 Motorway (Junctions 32–33 Northbound and Southbound Carriageways) (Temporary Restriction of Traffic) Order 2013
- M1 Motorway (Junction 35A to Junction 36) (Temporary Restriction of Traffic) Order 2013
- M1 Motorway (Junction 13 to Junction 15, Milton Keynes) (Temporary Restriction and Prohibition of Traffic) Order 2013
- Walsall Hospitals National Health Service Trust (Establishment) Amendment Order 2013
- M6 Motorway (Junction 23 Northbound and Southbound Slip Roads) and Rob Lane Motorway Depot Slip Roads (Temporary Prohibition of Traffic) Order 2013
- M6 Motorway (Junction 39–40 Harrowstead to Thrimby Northbound Carriageway) (Temporary Restriction of Traffic) Order 2013
- Council Tax (Administration and Enforcement) (Amendment) (Wales) Regulations 2013
- Council Tax (Demand Notices) (Wales) (Amendment) Regulations 2013
- Public Bodies (Abolition of the Railway Heritage Committee) Order 2013
- Passenger Car (Fuel Consumption and CO_{2} Emissions Information) (Amendment) Regulations 2013
- Boston (Electoral Changes) Order 2013
- Finance Act 2009, Sections 101 and 102 (Machine Games Duty) (Appointed Day) Order 2013
- Northamptonshire (Electoral Changes) Order 2013
- Purbeck (Electoral Changes) Order 2013
- Tonbridge and Malling (Electoral Changes) Order 2013
- M6 Motorway (Junctions 32-31A Southbound Carriageway) and the M55 (Junction 1 Eastbound Carriageway and Link Roads to the M6 Northbound and Southbound) (Temporary Restriction of Traffic) Order 2013
- A47 Trunk Road (Soke Parkway, Junction 20 Paston Parkway Interchange to Junction 17 Bretton Way Interchange, City of Peterborough) Westbound (Temporary Restriction and Prohibition of Traffic) Order 2013
- A1 Trunk Road (A1/A1(M) Alconbury Interchange, Cambridgeshire) Southbound Entry Slip Road (Temporary Prohibition of Traffic) Order 2013
- A14 Trunk Road (Huntingdon and Swavesey, Cambridgeshire) Lay-bys (Temporary Prohibition of Traffic) Order 2013
- M1 Motorway (Junction 44 and Junction 45) (Temporary Prohibition of Traffic) Order 2013
- Air Navigation (Restriction of Flying) (Northampton Sywell) Regulations 2013
- Legal Aid, Sentencing and Punishment of Offenders Act 2012 (Commencement No. 5 and Saving Provision) Order 2013
- M1 Motorway and the A42 Trunk Road (M1 Junction 23a) (Temporary Prohibition of Traffic) Order 2013
- M6 Motorway (Junction 10, Walsall) (Temporary Prohibition of Traffic) Order 2013
- M69 Motorway (M69 Junction 1 to M1 Junction 21) (Temporary Prohibition of Traffic) Order 2013
- A5 Trunk Road (North East of Nuneaton, Warwickshire) (Temporary Restriction and Prohibition of Traffic) Order 2013
- M5 Motorway (Frankley, Worcestershire) (Temporary Restriction of Traffic) Order 2013
- M69 Motorway (Junction 1) (Slip Roads) (Temporary Prohibition of Traffic) Order 2013
- A43 Trunk Road (Blisworth, Northamptonshire) (Temporary Restriction and Prohibition of Traffic) Order 2013
- M1 Motorway (Junctions 18 to 19) (Temporary Prohibition of Traffic) Order 2013
- Air Navigation (Restriction of Flying) (Stonehenge) Regulations 2013
- Air Navigation (Restriction of Flying) (Glastonbury Festival) Regulations 2013
- Air Navigation (Restriction of Flying) (Abingdon Air and Country Show) Regulations 2013
- Air Navigation (Restriction of Flying) (Duxford Aerodrome) Regulations 2013
- Air Navigation (Restriction of Flying) (Royal Air Force Waddington) Regulations 2013
- A470 Trunk Road (Llanrwst, Conwy) (Temporary Prohibition of Vehicles, Cyclists and Pedestrians) Order 2013
- Recovery of Costs Insurance Premiums in Clinical Negligence Proceedings Regulations 2013
- Offers to Settle in Civil Proceedings Order 2013
- Air Navigation (Restriction of Flying) (Vauxhall Bridge) Regulations 2013
- Air Navigation (Restriction of Flying) (Vauxhall Bridge) (Revocation) Regulations 2013
- A14 Trunk Road (Burton Latimer, Northamptonshire) (Temporary Prohibition of Traffic) Order 2013
- A38 Trunk Road (Barton-under-Needwood, Staffordshire) (Slip Roads) (Temporary Prohibition of Traffic) Order 2013
- A421 Trunk Road (Bedford Southern Bypass, Elstow, Bedfordshire) Slip Roads (Temporary Prohibition of Traffic) Order 2013
- Political Parties and Elections Act 2009 (Commencement No. 6) Order 2013
- A14 Trunk Road (near Naseby, Northamptonshire) (Temporary Prohibition of Traffic) Order 2013

=== 200–299 ===
- Timber and Timber Products (Placing on the Market) Regulations 2013 (SI 233/2013)

=== 600-699 ===
- Public Bodies (Abolition of British Shipbuilders) Order 2013 (SI 2013/687)

=== 1600-1699 ===
- Coroners (Investigations) Regulations 2013 (SI 2013/1629)
- Bathing Water Regulations 2013 (SI 2013/1675)

=== 3100-3199 ===
- Reporting of Injuries, Diseases and Dangerous Occurrences Regulations 2013 (SI 2013/1471)
- Exclusive Economic Zone Order 2013 (SI 2013/3161)

== See also ==
- List of statutory instruments of the United Kingdom
