= Bathing Water Regulations 2013 =

UK law on bathing places

- Statutory Instrument
- Parliament of the United Kingdom
- Citation: SI 2013/1675

Dates
- Made: 3 July 2013
- Laid before Parliament: 3 July 2013
- Commencement: 9 July 2013

Other legislation
- Made under: European Communities Act 1972
- Transposes: Bathing Waters Directive 2006 (2006/7/EC)

Text of the Bathing Water Regulations 2013 as in force today (including any amendments) within the United Kingdom, from legislation.gov.uk.

In England the Bathing Water Regulations 2013 (SI 2013/1675) is a statutory instrument defining water suitable for bathing (in the sense of recreational swimming and paddling), other than swimming pools and similar places. An annual list of bathing places is produced. The water must pass water quality standards set by the Environment Agency.

In December 2020 it was announced that a stretch of the River Wharfe at Ilkley in West Yorkshire would become the first river bathing place to be added to the list, which hitherto included coastal sites and lakes.
