= Reporting of Injuries, Diseases and Dangerous Occurrences Regulations =

United Kingdom legislation

Reporting of Injuries, Diseases and Dangerous Occurrences Regulations 2013
- Statutory Instrument
- Parliament of the United Kingdom
- Citation: SI 2013/1471
- Introduced by: Paul Beresford – Department of the Environment
- Territorial extent: United Kingdom, overseas

Dates
- Made: 12 June 2013
- Laid before Parliament: 10 June 2013
- Commencement: 1 October 2013; 13 years ago
Other legislation
Repeals/revokes	Reporting of Injuries, Diseases and Dangerous Occurrences Regulations 1995; Reporting of Injuries, Diseases and Dangerous Occurrences (Amendment) Regulations 2012
Made under	Health and Safety at Work etc. Act 1974; Offshore Safety Act 1992; Railways Act 1993

Status: Current legislation

Text of statute as originally enacted

Text of the Reporting of Injuries, Diseases and Dangerous Occurrences Regulations 2013 as in force today (including any amendments) within the United Kingdom, from legislation.gov.uk.

Reporting of Injuries, Diseases and Dangerous Occurrences Regulations 1995
- Statutory Instrument
- Parliament of the United Kingdom
- Citation: SI 1995/3163

Dates
- Made: 6 December 1995
- Laid before Parliament: 14 December 1995
- Commencement: 1 April 1996
Other legislation
Repeals/revokes	Reporting of Injuries, Diseases and Dangerous Occurrences Regulations 1985]]; Reporting of Injuries, Diseases and Dangerous Occurrences (Amendment) Regulations 1989; Railways (Notice of Accidents) Order 1986; Offshore Installations (Amendment) Regulations 1991
Made under	Health and Safety at Work etc. Act 1974; Offshore Safety Act 1992; Railways Act 1993
Revoked by	Reporting of Injuries, Diseases and Dangerous Occurrences 2013

Status: Revoked

Text of statute as originally enacted

Reporting of Injuries, Diseases and Dangerous Occurrences Regulations 1985
- Statutory Instrument
- Parliament of the United Kingdom
- Citation: SI 1985/2023

Dates
- Made: 17 December 1985
- Laid before Parliament: 16 January 1986
- Commencement: 1 April 1986
Other legislation
Made under	Health and Safety at Work etc. Act 1974
Revoked by	Reporting of Injuries, Diseases and Dangerous Occurrences Regulations 1995

Status: Revoked

Text of statute as originally enacted

The Reporting of Injuries, Diseases and Dangerous Occurrences Regulations 2013 (SI 2013/1471), often known by the acronym RIDDOR, is a 2013 statutory instrument of the Parliament of the United Kingdom. It regulates the statutory obligation to report deaths, injuries, diseases and "dangerous occurrences", including near misses, that take place at work or in connection with work.

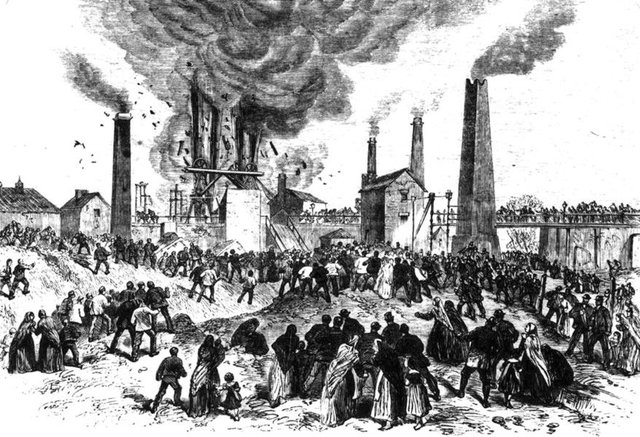
One of the worst colliery explosions – the Oaks colliery disaster killed more than 300 people in 1866.

The regulations require "responsible persons" to report deaths at work, major injuries caused by accidents at work, injuries to persons not at work that require hospital treatment, injuries arising from accidents in hospitals, and dangerous occurrences (reg.3(1)). Additionally, the law requires registered gas fitters to report poor and dangerous gas installations (reg.6).

Responsible persons are generally employers but also include various managers and occupiers of premises (reg.2). Though the regulations do not impose a specific obligation on employees, they have a general obligation under section 7 of the Health and Safety at Work etc. Act 1974 to take care of safety. The Health and Safety Executive recommends that they report incidents to their employer and encourages voluntary notification to the relevant regulating authority.

There are specific regulations as to mines and quarries (reg.8/ Sch.5), and offshore installations (reg.9/ Sch.6).

Medical treatments are exempt, as are injuries arising from road traffic accidents and to members of the armed forces (reg.10).

Breach of the regulations is a crime, punishable on summary conviction with a fine of up to £400. If convicted on indictment in the Crown Court, an offender can be sentenced to an unlimited fine. Either an individual or a corporation can be punished and sentencing practice is published by the Sentencing Guidelines Council. For example, in 2000, Salford City Council were fined £115,000 for a breach of the regulations.

It is a defence that the responsible person was not aware of the event requiring reporting or notification and that he had taken all reasonable steps to have such events brought to his notice (reg.11). The burden of proof of such a defence is on the defendant, on the balance of probabilities.

== Background ==
The reporting of accidents and ill health at work has long been a legal requirement in the UK. The information enables the Health and Safety Executive (HSE) and local government authorities "to identify where and how risks arise, and to investigate serious accidents".

During 2006-2007 about 30 million working days were lost due to work-related ill health, and 6 million due to workplace injury. In the same period, there were 141,350 incidents reported although it has been estimated that some 274,000 ought to have been reported. Further, 241 people were killed at work during this time. This figure obscures the fact that in 2005, 2037 people died from mesothelioma arising from previous exposure to asbestos and "thousands more from other occupational cancers and lung diseases".

The regulations were intended to consolidate a number of earlier regulations on the reporting of accidents and diseases, generally in the workplace and specifically in the railway and offshore industries.

== Notification ==
Notification must be made by a responsible person to the relevant enforcing authority which is a body, possibly the local government authority, to which the HSE has delegated its powers. Notification must be made

— when any person, not necessarily an employee (reg.3):

- Dies as a result of an accident at work;

— or, when any person other than an employee suffers:

- An injury as a result of an accident at work and that person has to be taken to hospital; or
- A major injury as a result of an accident at work that takes place at a hospital;

— or, when an employee:

- Suffers a major injury as a result of an accident at work; or
- Is incapacitated, either under his contract of employment or for seven consecutive days (three days prior to 6 April 2012), because of an accident at work;

— or, there is a dangerous occurrence.

"Accident" includes assaults on employees and suicides on transport systems (reg.2). The report must be made by the "quickest practicable means" and confirmed by a written report within ten days (reg.3(2)). When an accident at work results in a reportable injury that, within a year of the accident, causes the death of the employee, the death itself must be reported, even if the accident and injury have already been reported (reg.4). On occasions, an injury may caused a member of staff to be off work for more than seven working days, or prevent them from completing their normal work duties. If this situation arises then the company must notify the enforcing authority of the incident. When calculating the seven consecutive days, the day of the accident is not counted but the period after is, including weekends. For example, if an employee normally works Monday to Friday, is injured on a Tuesday and does not return to work until the following Thursday, then the incident will be required to be reported. This is because he/she will have been off work for eight days i.e. Wednesday to Wednesday inclusive.

According to the RIDDOR, such accidents must be reported in which an employee or self-employed person is away from work or cannot perform their normal duties for more than seven consecutive days because of their injuries. According to the rules, the day of the accident is not included in this seven day period. However, it does include the weekends and rest days. Such an accident must be reported to the RIDDOR within 15 days of the accident.

=== Major injuries ===
"Major injuries" are defined as (reg.2(1)/ Sch.1):

Fracture, other than to fingers, thumbs or toes	Amputation
Dislocation of the shoulder, hip, knee or spine	Loss of sight, temporary or permanent
Chemical or hot metal burn to, or penetrating injury of, the eye	Injury from electric shock or burn leading to unconsciousness or requiring resuscitation or more than 24 hours in hospital
Injury leading to hypothermia, heat-induced illness or to unconsciousness	Injury requiring resuscitation
Injury requiring admittance to hospital for more than 24 hours	Loss of consciousness through asphyxia or exposure to a harmful substance or biological agent
Acute illness requiring medical treatment or loss of consciousness, resulting from the absorption of any substance by inhalation, ingestion or through the skin	Acute illness requiring medical treatment where there is reason to believe that it resulted from exposure to a biological agent or its toxins or infected material.

=== Dangerous occurrences reportable in all workplaces ===
Dangerous occurrences that are reportable by all responsible persons are defined as (reg.2(1)/ Sch.2, Pt.1, paras.1-17):

Lifting machinery, etc. - Collapse, overturning, or failure of any load-bearing part of a lift or hoist, crane or derrick, mobile powered access platform, access or window cleaning cradle, excavator, pile-driving frame or rig taller than 7 metres, or forklift truck.

Pressure systems - Failure of a closed vessel, including a boiler or boiler tube, or of any associated pipework, in which the internal pressure was above or below atmospheric pressure, and the failure has the potential to cause death.

Freight containers - Failure of a freight container in any of its load-bearing parts while it is being raised, lowered or suspended.

Overhead electric lines - Unintentional incident in which plant or equipment either:

- Comes into contact with an uninsulated overhead electric line in which the voltage exceeds 200 volts; or
- Causes an electrical discharge from such an electric line by coming into proximity.

Electrical short circuit - Electrical short circuit or overload accompanied by fire or explosion which results in the stoppage of the plant involved for more than 24 hours or which has the potential to cause death.

Explosives - Various incidents with explosives.

Biological agents - An accident or incident which resulted, or could have resulted, in release or escape of a biological agent likely to cause severe human infection or illness.

Malfunction of radiation generators, etc. - Incident in which:

- Malfunction of a radiation generator, or ancillary equipment, used in industrial radiography, food irradiation or processing of products by irradiation, causes it to fail to de-energise at the end of the intended exposure period; or
- Malfunction of equipment used in industrial radiography or gamma irradiation causes a radioactive source to fail to return to its safe position by the normal means at the end of the intended exposure period.

Breathing apparatus - Malfunction of breathing apparatus while in use or in testing as a preliminary to use.

Diving operations - Any of the following incidents during underwater diving:

- Failure or endangering of lifting equipment associated with the diving operation, or life support equipment, including control panels, hoses and breathing apparatus, that puts a diver at risk;
- Damage to, or endangering of, the dive platform, or failure of the dive platform to remain on station, that puts a diver at risk;
- Trapping of a diver;
- Explosion in the vicinity of a diver; or
- Uncontrolled ascent or any omitted decompression that puts a diver at risk.

Collapse of scaffolding - Complete or partial collapse of a scaffold:

- Over 5 metres high that results in a substantial part of the scaffold falling or overturning; or
- Erected over or adjacent to water in circumstances such that there would be a risk of drowning;

— or the complete or partial collapse of the suspension arrangements, including any outrigger, of any slung or suspended scaffold that causes a working platform or cradle to fall.

Train collisions - Unintended collision of a train with any other train or vehicle, other than one reportable under Pt.4 of Sch.3 of the regulations, which caused, or might have caused, death or major injury.

Wells - Any of the following incidents in relation to a well, other than a water well:

- Uncontrolled flow of fluids from the well (blow-out);
- Activation of a blow-out prevention or diversion system to control a flow from a well where normal control procedures fail;
- Detection of unanticipated hydrogen sulphide in the course of operations or in samples of well-fluids;
- Precautionary measures additional to any contained in the original drilling programme following failure to maintain a planned minimum separation distance between wells drilled from a particular installation; or
- Mechanical failure of any safety critical element of a well.

Pipelines or pipeline works - The following incidents in respect of a pipeline or pipeline works:

- Uncontrolled or accidental escape of anything from, or inrush of anything into, a pipeline that has the potential to cause death, major injury or damage to health, or which results in the pipeline being shut down for more than 24 hours;
- Unintentional ignition of anything in or escaping from a pipeline;
- Damage to any part of a pipeline that has the potential to cause death, major injury or damage to health, or which results in the pipeline being shut down for more than 24 hours;
- Substantial and unintentional change in the position of a pipeline requiring immediate attention to safeguard its integrity or safety;
- Unintentional change in the subsoil or seabed in the vicinity of a pipeline that has the potential to affect the integrity or safety of a pipeline;
- Failure of any pipeline isolation device, equipment or system that has the potential to cause death, major injury or damage to health, or which results in the pipeline being shut down for more than 24 hours; or
- Failure of equipment involved with pipeline works that has the potential to cause death, major injury or damage to health.

Fairground equipment - The following incidents on fairground equipment, in use or under test:

- Failure of any load-bearing part;
- Failure of any part designed to support or restrain passengers; or
- Derailment or unintended collision of cars or trains.

Carriage of dangerous substances by road tankers - Incident involving a road tanker or tank container used for the carriage of a dangerous substance in which:

- The road tanker or vehicle carrying the tank container overturns (including turning onto its side);
- The tank carrying the dangerous substance is seriously damaged;
- There is an uncontrolled release or escape of the dangerous substance; or
- There is a fire involving the dangerous substance.

Carriage of dangerous substances by road in packages - Incident involving a vehicle used for the carriage of a dangerous substance in which:

- Uncontrolled release or escape of the dangerous substance in such a quantity as to have the potential to cause death, or major injury; or
- Fire involving the dangerous substance.

=== Dangerous occurrences reportable save in offshore workplaces ===
Dangerous occurrences that are reportable by responsible persons, save in offshore workplaces, are defined as (reg.2(1)/ Sch.2, Pt.1, paras.18-21):

Collapse of building or structure - Unintended collapse or partial collapse of:

- Building or structure, whether above or below ground, under construction, reconstruction, alteration or demolition which involves a fall of more than 5 tonnes of material;
- Floor or wall of any building, whether above or below ground, used as a place of work; or
- Falsework.

Explosion or fire - Explosion or fire, due to ignition of material, in any plant or premises that results in the stoppage of that plant, or as the case may be the suspension of normal work, for more than 24 hours.

Escape of flammable substances - Sudden, uncontrolled release inside a building of:

- 100 kilograms or more of flammable liquid;
- 10 kilograms or more of flammable liquid at a temperature above its normal boiling point; or
- 10 kilograms or more of flammable gas;

— or, in the open air, of 500 kilograms or more of a flammable liquid or gas.

Escape of substances - Accidental release or escape of any substance in a quantity sufficient to cause death, major injury or any other damage to health.

=== Dangerous occurrences reportable in specific industries ===
There are also specific reporting requirements for mines (Sch.2/ Pt.2, paras.22-40), quarries (Sch.2/ Pt.3, paras.41-48), rail transport systems (Sch.2/ Pt.4, paras.49-72) and offshore installations (Sch.2/ Pt.5, paras.73-83).

== Reporting of cases of disease ==
The responsible person must make a report "forthwith" if they are notified by a registered medical practitioner that an employee is suffering from (reg.5/ Sch.3 Pt.1):

Disease	Activity	Disease	Activity
Inflammation, ulceration etc. of the skin or bone, or blood dyscrasia	Work with ionising radiation	Cataract	Work with electromagnetic radiation
Decompression illness, barotrauma, dysbaric osteonecrosis	Breathing compressed gases, including diving	Cramp in hand or forearm	Handwriting, typing etc..
Subcutaneous cellulitis of the hand (beat hand)	Heavy work involving friction or pressure on the hand	Bursitis or subcutaneous cellulitis of the knee (beat knee)	Heavy work involving friction or pressure on the knee
Bursitis or subcutaneous cellulitis of the elbow	Heavy work involving friction or pressure on the elbow (beat elbow)	Traumatic inflammation of hand or forearm tendons or associated tendon sheaths	Frequent or repeated movements, constrained postures, extremes of extension or flexion of the hand or wrist
Carpal tunnel syndrome	Work with hand-held vibrating tools	Hand-arm vibration syndrome	Various work
Anthrax	Work with infected animals or on infested sites	Brucellosis	Work with animals or specimens
Avian chlamydiosis	Work with infected birds	Ovine chlamydiosis	Work with infected sheep
Hepatitis	Work with human blood or sources of viral hepatitis	Legionellosis	Work on air conditioning or other water services
Leptospirosis	Various places likely to be infested by small mammals, including dog kennels	Lyme disease	Outdoor work involving exposure to ticks
Q fever	Contact with animals	Rabies	Contact with infected animals
Streptococcus suis	Work with infected pigs	Tetanus	Work involving contaminated soil
Tuberculosis	Work with any potential biological source of infection	Any reliably attributable infection	Work with micro-organisms, cadavers and animal products
Poisoning from various specified substances	Any work	Cancer of bronchus or lung	Work where nickel is produced from a gaseous nickel compound or involving exposure to chloromethyl ether or various electrolytic chromium processes
Primary carcinoma of the lung with evidence of silicosis	Various activities	Cancer of the urinary tract	Exposure to various substances
Bladder cancer	Aluminium smelting by the Soderberg process	Angiosarcoma of the liver	Work in the polymerisation of vinyl chloride monomer
Peripheral neuropathy	Exposure to n-hexane or methyl n-butyl ketone	Chrome ulceration of nose, throat, hands or forearm	Exposure to chromic acid or other chromium compound
Folliculitis	Exposure to mineral oil, tar, pitch or arsenic	Acne	Exposure to mineral oil, tar, pitch or arsenic
Skin cancer	Exposure to mineral oil, tar, pitch or arsenic	Pneumoconiosis (excluding asbestosis)	Various activities
Byssinosis	Work with cotton or flax	Mesothelioma	Work with asbestos
Lung cancer	Work with asbestos or asbestos textiles	Asbestosis	Cleaning equipment used for working asbestos/ exposure to asbestos dust
Cancer of nasal cavity or air sinuses	Work in a building where furniture or footwear is manufactured, or where nickel is produced from a gaseous nickel compound	Occupational dermatitis	Work involving various substances
Extrinsic alveolitis (including Farmer's lung)	Exposure to moulds, fungal spores or heterologous proteins	Occupational asthma	Work involving various substances

Certain work related diseases contracted in offshore facilities must also be reported (reg.5/ Sch.3 Pt.2).

== Gas installations ==
Reports must be made to the HSE within 14 days where there is, or is likely to be, incomplete combustion of gas, leaking gas or inadequate removal of the results of the combustion of gas (reg.6).

== Record keeping ==
The responsible person, such as an employer, must keep records of reportable incidents and diseases, and other matters specified by the HSE to demonstrate compliance. Records are to be kept for 3 years, either at the place where the relevant work is carried out or at the responsible person's usual place of business. The enforcing authority may demand copies of such records (reg.7/ Sch.4).

== Bibliography ==
- [Various authors] (2007). Tolley's Health and Safety at Work Handbook 2008. London: Butterworths. ISBN 978-0-7545-3318-4.
- Stranks, J. (2005). Health and Safety Law (5th ed.). London: Prentice Hall. pp. p.301. ISBN 0-13-197646-X.
