= United Nations Security Council Resolution 502 =

UN Security Council Resolution 502
- Map of the Falkland Islands
- Date: 3 April 1982
- Meeting no.: 2,350
- Code: S/RES/502 (Document)
- Subject: Falkland Islands
- Voting summary: 10 voted for; 1 voted against; 4 abstained
- Result: Adopted

Security Council composition
- Permanent members: China; France; Soviet Union; United Kingdom; United States
- Non-permanent members: Guyana; Ireland; Jordan; Japan; Panama; Poland; Spain; Togo; Uganda; Zaire

United Nations Security Council Resolution 502 was a resolution adopted by the United Nations Security Council on 3 April 1982. After expressing its concern at the invasion of the Falkland Islands by the armed forces of Argentina, the council demanded an immediate cessation of hostilities between Argentina and the United Kingdom and a complete withdrawal by Argentine forces. The council also called on the governments of Argentina and the United Kingdom to seek a diplomatic solution to the situation and refrain from further military action.

The resolution by the British representative, Ambassador Sir Anthony Parsons, was adopted by 10 votes in favour (France, United Kingdom, United States, Zaire, Guyana, Ireland, Japan, Jordan, Togo and Uganda) to 1 against (Panama) with four abstentions (China, Poland, Spain and the Soviet Union).

Resolution 502 was in the United Kingdom's favour by giving it the option to invoke Article 51 of the United Nations Charter and to claim the right of self-defence. It was supported by members of the Commonwealth and by the European Economic Community, which later imposed sanctions on Argentina.

== Abstract text ==
Recalling the statement made by the President of the Security Council at the 2345th meeting of the council on 1 April 1982 calling on the Governments of Argentina and the United Kingdom of Great Britain and Northern Ireland to refrain from the use or threat of force in the region of the Falkland Islands (Islas Malvinas),

Deeply disturbed at reports of an invasion on 2 April 1982 by armed forces of Argentina,

Determining that there exists a breach of the peace in the region of the Falkland Islands (Islas Malvinas),

1. Demands an immediate cessation of hostilities;

2. Demands an immediate withdrawal of all Argentine forces from the Falkland Islands (Islas Malvinas);

3. Calls on the Governments of Argentina and the United Kingdom of Great Britain and Northern Ireland to seek a diplomatic solution to their differences and to respect fully the purposes and principles of the Charter of the United Nations.

Adopted at the 2350th meeting by 10 votes to 1 (Panama), with 4 abstentions (China, Poland, Spain, Union of Soviet Socialist Republics).

== See also ==
- Argentina–United Kingdom relations
- Falklands War
- Invasion of South Georgia
- List of United Nations Security Council Resolutions 501 to 600 (1982–1987)
- United Nations Security Council Resolution 505
