= Rockall Bank dispute =

Conflicting maritime claims

Exclusive economic zones of the countries claiming an interest in the dispute.

Several states have claimed interests over the sea bed adjoining Rockall, an uninhabitable granite islet which is located within the exclusive economic zone (EEZ) of the United Kingdom. Ireland, Denmark, Iceland, and they have all made submissions to the commission set up under the United Nations Convention on the Law of the Sea (UNCLOS).

== Overview ==
The United Nations Convention on the Law of the Sea states, "Rocks which cannot sustain human habitation or economic life of their own shall have no exclusive economic zone or continental shelf."

The convention was ratified by all four states in dispute over the Rockall Plateau – Iceland on 26 January 1985, Ireland on 21 January 1996, the United Kingdom on 25 July 1997 and Denmark on 16 November 2004.

The twenty-fourth session of the United Nations Commission on the Limits of the Continental Shelf (CLCS) was held in New York from 10 August to 11 September 2009. Iceland, Ireland, and the United Kingdom have made submissions. Denmark was due to make a submission before the end of 2014.

On 7 November 1988 the United Kingdom and Ireland agreed a delineation which ignores Rockall's existence and have granted exploration rights. This bilateral agreement is disputed by Iceland and by Denmark.

In 1997, the UK Government declared that "The United Kingdom's fishery limits will need to be redefined based on St Kilda, since Rockall is not a valid base point for such limits under Article 121(3) of the Convention." This is the only example to date of a state voluntarily downgrading an insular feature to "a rock" and thus reducing the area of its claimed maritime zones.

Rockall is within the Exclusive Economic Zone (EEZ) claimed by the United Kingdom. In 1997, the UK ratified the United Nations Convention on the Law of the Sea and thus relinquished any claim to an extension of its EEZ beyond the islet. The remaining issue is the status of the continental shelf rights of the surrounding ocean floor. These are the exclusive rights to exploit any resources on or under the ocean floor (oil, natural gas, etc.) and should not be confused with the EEZ, as continental shelf rights do not carry any privileges with regard to fisheries. Ownership of these rights in the Rockall area are disputed between the United Kingdom, Denmark (for the Faroe Islands), Ireland and Iceland.

== Individual claims ==
=== Danish claim via Faroe Islands ===
The Faroe Islands are an autonomous country of the Kingdom of Denmark. Since 1948 they have had self-government in almost all matters except defence and foreign affairs. Consequently, their interests in Rockall are represented by Denmark. On their behalf, Denmark claims continental shelf rights in the Hatton-Rockall area.

A communiqué issued by the Prime Minister's Office on 7 May 1985 announced the designation of not only the seabed in the immediate vicinity of the Faroes but also a vast area of the Rockall plateau to the south west. The press release which accompanied the communiqué indicated that the legal basis of this designation was the assumption that "the Faroe Islands are part of the microcontinent" formed by the "Faroes-Rockall Plateau", an "elevated plain with its summit in the Faroe Islands".

=== Icelandic claim ===
Iceland does not claim the rock itself, considering it irrelevant as far as delimitation of EEZs and continental shelf is concerned. Iceland however claims an extended continental shelf in the Hatton-Rockall area.

Despite its long history of human habitation into the 20th century, Iceland considers St. Kilda to be "a minuscule, effectively uninhabited, islet, categorized under article 121(3) of the Law of the Sea Convention". Furthermore, St. Kilda lies outside the British territorial sea limit. Therefore, it is not an "equitable basepoint for an equidistant line".

Iceland ratified the United Nations Convention on the Law of the Sea in 1985; it was the first Western country to do so. A regulation was issued by the government in that same year outlining the area where Iceland claimed continental shelf rights for itself; the regulation was based on legislation from 1979 claiming for Iceland the exclusive right to research and exploitation of continental shelf-based resources within the limits of the Icelandic continental shelf. Regarding the Hatton-Rockall area, it claims the area within 60 nautical miles (110 km) from the foot of the continental shelf and assumes that the UK and Ireland cannot claim a continental shelf outside their EEZs. To its fullest extent, this area reaches about 700 nautical miles (1,300 km) to the south from Iceland's coast, which is further south than the United Kingdom's northernmost point.

In 2001, Iceland began working on its submission to the Commission on the Limits of the Continental Shelf; it was scheduled to finish in 2007. The most important aspect of this work is to survey the entire ocean floor in the areas claimed outside the EEZ and, in Iceland's case, a part of the area inside the EEZ as well. In all, 1.3 million square kilometres (380,000 square nautical miles) have been surveyed by Icelandic marine research institutions for this purpose, an area 13 times larger than the land area of Iceland. The commission does however not make proposals regarding areas that are claimed by two or more states unless they have already reached an agreement on its division. Therefore, Iceland's submission is expected to deal only with the area that just Iceland has claimed and not the Hatton-Rockall area. Iceland also hosted an informal meeting of all parties to the dispute in 2001. It was the first such meeting regarding the dispute where all four countries participated.

=== Irish claim ===
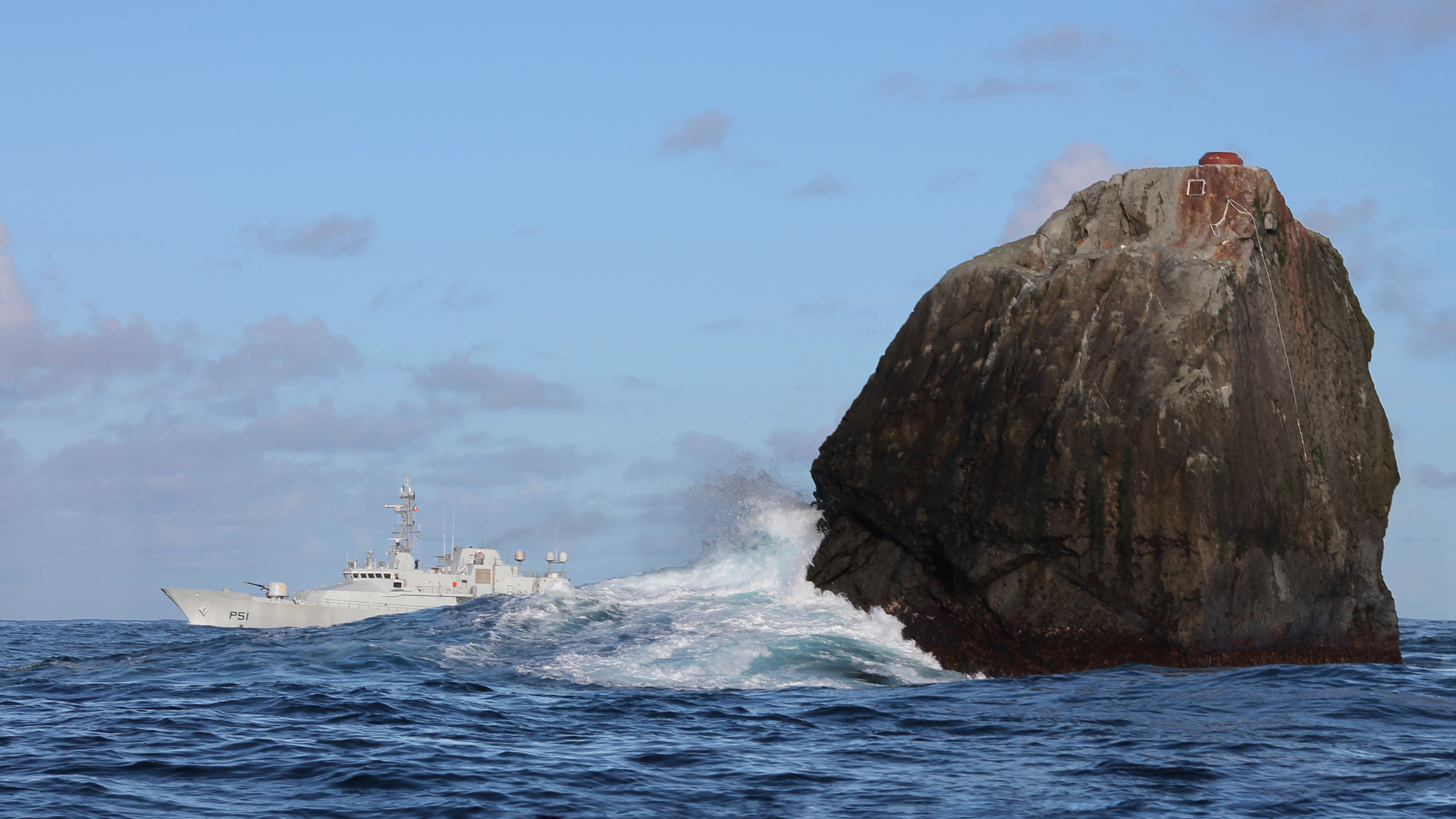
The Irish Naval Service vessel, LÉ Róisín, on routine patrol at Rockall, 230 nautical miles (430 km) off the north-west coast of Ireland, 12 October 2012

According to a Written Parliamentary Answer from the Irish Minister of Foreign Affairs on 14 June 1990, an agreement was reached between the British and Irish governments on delimitation of the continental shelf between the two countries and that this included a line of delimitation across the Rockall Plateau. As a result, a very extensive area under Irish jurisdiction, including part of the Rockall Trough and Plateau, is not disputed by the United Kingdom. No further negotiations were taking place in relation to the rock at the time.

More recently, on 11 June 2003, the Irish Minister for Communications, Marine and Natural Resources gave a Written Parliamentary Answer, stating: "Ireland claims an extended continental shelf ... up to more than 500 nautical miles (926 km), particularly in the Hatton–Rockall area".

As the United Nations has no mandate regarding issues of delimitation between neighbouring states and cannot consider an area under dispute without the agreement of all the parties concerned, Ireland has participated in informal discussions with Iceland and the Faroe Islands in an attempt to resolve the dispute before making its submission to the Commission.

== Conferences ==
=== Reykjavík conference ===
Representatives from the UK, Ireland, Iceland, and Denmark, met in Reykjavík, Iceland in September 2007 for negotiations over territorial rights over the continental shelf in the area. The final boundary will be determined by the United Nations Commission on the Limits of the Continental Shelf. The parties have until May 2009 to submit reports to the commission, which it will take into account when determining the boundary. The involved nations have the option of submitting separate reports, or a joint one.

Ownership of the rock itself did not form part of the negotiations.

=== Copenhagen conference ===
In November 2007, talks were held in Copenhagen. Here a template for a deal was secured by Irish, Danish, British and Icelandic diplomats.

=== Dublin conference ===
As a follow-up to Copenhagen, the Government of Ireland was to host negotiations. They were due to commence in January 2008, but were postponed because of elections in the Faroe Islands. The talks are hoped to bring the four nations closer to reaching an agreement over the Rockall-Hatton basin. It is understood a final deal is not likely to be agreed at the Dublin meeting. The Irish Minister for Foreign Affairs at the time, Dermot Ahern said

There have certainly been protracted talks, but that is not unusual when one considers the complexity of the issue at hand and the competing interests. However, there was some progress made at the last talks in Copenhagen. I believe further progress can be made in Dublin. The deadline is May 2009 so we have time on our hands. It is in the interests of Ireland, UK, Denmark and Iceland to come to a deal on the division of the seabed area. We have come to outline agreements in relation to other parts of our seabed in the Atlantic. There is no reason ultimately why we also can't do a deal on this protracted issue. Finding a deal is a significant challenge but the rewards are there for future generations from all four countries.

The latest conference between all four parties occurred in Reykjavik in May 2011.
