= Battle of Curitibanos =

Battle of the Ragamuffin War

- Part of the Ragamuffin War
Date	January 12, 1840
Location	Curitibanos, Santa Catarina, Empire of Brazil
Result	Imperial victory

Belligerents
Piratini Republic	Empire of Brazil

Commanders and leaders
Teixeira Nunes; Giuseppe Garibaldi	Antônio de Melo Albuquerque

Strength
450 men	400 men

Casualties and losses
60 dead 3 captured	5 dead 20 wounded

The Battle of Curitibanos was a battle of the Ragamuffin War, fought by loyalist Imperial forces under Antônio de Melo Albuquerque, and retreating Julian troops under Colonel Teixeira Nunes who had been fleeing towards Rio Grande do Sul after the rebel defeat at Laguna. It was an Imperial victory.

== Background ==
The short-lived breakaway Juliana Republic in Santa Catarina had been vanquished when Laguna, its capital, was retaken by Imperial forces. While the bulk of its men, under David Canabarro, withdrew without fighting and made it back with relative ease to Rio Grande do Sul, their stronghold under the Riograndense Republic, Colonel Teixeira Nunes's men, who had marched west before retreating to the south, were in a less favorable position, being pursued by loyalist troops on their march south. Circa 450 men strong, they were met by a 400 men strong force of national guardsmen and volunteers under Colonel Antônio de Melo Albuquerque at Curitibanos, close to the Marombas River, on 12 January 1840, little less than two months after the battle at Laguna.

== Engagement ==
The battle began when the Imperial force attacked the rebels' advanced position, alerting the latter to their presence. The rebels counterattacked, and eventually pushed the Imperial force to the shore of the Marombas River. When the Imperials started to disorderly retreat across the river, the Republican cavalry charged them, but the retreat was a feint and they were caught in an Imperial ambush. After the ambush was sprung with heavy losses for the rebels, a pursuit started.

Giuseppe Garibaldi fought in this battle, commanding the rebel infantry, and he managed to escape the pursuit. Regarding his future wife Anita's participation in it, Imperial commander Melo Albuquerque later wrote: "When the fighting became more fierce, one could see it was Anita who motivated to the greatest extent her husband's soldiers to be brave. My officers, especially those in the front, told me she fought with sword in hand and with beautiful flowing hair and was the most exposed to our bullets; she was who worked the hardest for her husband's victory, at times making the result achieved by my forces a matter of doubt. Finally, seeing the number of her brave soldiers whittled down, by the death of many and the wounding of others, seeing herself as completely surrounded by my men, she let herself fall prisioner, followed by some fighters." (Note: This is a translation from the original Portuguese, which reads: "Quando o combate tornou-se mais renhido, via-se que era Anita quem mais animava os soldados do seu marido a serem valentes. Os meus oficiais, especialmente os que estavam na vanguarda, me referiram que era a combatente com a espada em punho e com seus lindos cabelos flutuantes que mais se expunha às nossas balas; que mais trabalhava pela vitória de seu marido, tendo por vezes posto em dúvida a sorte de minhas forças. Finalmente, vendo reduzido o número de seus bravos soldados, pela morte de muitos e ferimentos de outros, como vendo-se completamente cercada por meus comandados, deixou-se aprisionar, seguida de alguns combatentes.")
