= Battle of Santa Vitória =

Battle of the Ragamuffin War

- Part of the Ragamuffin War
Date	December 14, 1839
Location	Pelotas River, Empire of Brazil
Result	Republican victory

Belligerents
Piratini Republic	Empire of Brazil

Commanders and leaders
Teixeira Nunes; Giuseppe Garibaldi	Xavier da Cunha ‽

Strength
500 men	2,000 men

Casualties and losses
25 dead	86 dead 106 captured

The Battle of Santa Vitória was a battle of the Ragamuffin War, fought by loyalist Imperial forces under Brigadier Xavier da Cunha, and retreating Julian troops under Colonel Teixeira Nunes who had been fleeing towards Rio Grande do Sul after the rebel defeat at Laguna. It was a Republican victory despite an Imperial advantage in numbers.

== Background ==
The short-lived breakaway Juliana Republic in Santa Catarina had been vanquished when Laguna, its capital, was retaken by Imperial forces. Colonel Teixeira Nunes's men, who had marched west before retreating to the south, were in an unfavorable position, being pursued by loyalist troops on their march south towards the relative safety of the Riograndense Republic.

== Engagement ==
Over the 13th of December, initial contacts were made between both forces. On the next day, a determined attack was made by the Republican forces, breaking the overconfident Imperials' advance position (set across the Pelotas River from the bulk of the Imperial force) and forcing them to retreat. Over 50 of them drowned on the Pelotas River, including Cunha, the Imperial commander. Giuseppe Garibaldi fought in the battle, and his future wife Anita administered first aid to the wounded.

The prisoners made by Teixeira Nunes were freed after the battle, on the condition they would return to their homes to tend to their families. Another account has them being forced to enlist into the Republican cavalry.

As a result of the battle, the city of Lages was captured by the Republican forces.
