= Porongos Massacre =

Battle during the Ragamuffin War, Brazil

- Part of the Ragamuffin War
Date	14 November 1844
Location	Porongos stream (present-day Pinheiro Machado, Rio Grande do Sul, Brazil) 31°22′53″S 53°32′18″W
Result	Imperial victory

Belligerents
Piratini Republic	Empire of Brazil

Commanders and leaders
David Canabarro; Teixeira Nunes	Chico Pedro

Strength
150 lancers	260 soldiers

Casualties and losses
96 killed	55 killed

Porongos Massacre or Porongos Betrayal was the penultimate confrontation of the Ragamuffin War (1835–1845) and occurred on 14 November 1844. The battle was primarily responsible for ending the longest of Brazil's revolutions.

In November 1844, about a year before the end of the conflict, and with peace negotiations already underway, the more than 1,200 republicans, led by General David Canabarro, were surrounded and massacred in the unprotected countryside, due to Canabarro's negligence, according to some, or his treachery, according to others, by the more than 1,100 partisans who supported the Empire, led by Francisco Pedro de Abreu. Because of the siege and the military strategy constructed by Francisco de Abreu, it was possible to defeat the Republicans and, consequently, paralyze the anti-imperial revolutionary movement. Fearing a surprise attack, Antônio Netto decided to camp with his troops further away and ended up escaping defeat.

For the revolutionaries, the battle of Porongos resulted in the death of 110 supporters of the republic, the arrest of 333 men - 35 of them officers -, five banners, a cannon, utensils, archives, and more than 1000 horses. For this reason, the episode became known as one of the biggest losses that the republican movement had until then in the Ragamuffin War.

== Historical context ==
The Ragamuffin Movement was marked in history as a movement of the Brazilian regency period against the imposition of a provincial president by the Central Government (without consulting the provincial government). The movement had a liberal character and intended to achieve more provincial autonomy in face of the recently ended Brazilian First Reign.

The term Ragamuffin ("Farroupilha") refers to the popular combatants that composed the troops, who were known for wearing ragged clothes (known as "farrapos"), although the political leadership was represented by sectors of the local agrarian elite. The war lasted ten years as the farrapos continuously received supplies from the border countries: The jerky (charque) from the provinces was smuggled to Uruguay and entered Brazil as if it came from Uruguay. This contributed to the economic sustenance of the Republicans.

The landowners, cattle owners, and slave owners in the south were dissatisfied with the decisions that were being taken by the Brazilian court, especially regarding the taxes levied on the provinces. Rio Grande do Sul, at the time, had among the main products of its economy cattle and charque production, used to feed slaves from all Brazilian provinces. The rio-grandenses, as the provincial authorities were called, accused the Central Government of harming their economic interests, mainly by allowing charque from Uruguay to enter the Brazilian market at a lower price.

Furthermore, it was the court that determined which percentage of the taxes collected in the provinces remained and which should be destined to Rio de Janeiro, the seat of government. Besides this economic character, there was political dissatisfaction since it was the Central Government that determined which ruler would command the provincial lands. These men were selected without consultation with the landowners in the provinces, and often the leaders selected did not meet the demands of these landowners and, consequently, the interests of the region.

Adding to the tensions, was the dissatisfaction about the military campaigns that were taking place on the southern borders. Rio Grande do Sul had contributed by sending men to help Brazil in the wars with the platinos peoples, but still, the leadership of the troops was assigned to someone from outside. With the sum of these factors, on September 20, 1835, the Ragamuffin War began.

The movement had gained national attention the following year, in 1836, when the Rio Grande do Sul province decreed the Rio-Grandense Republic. The movement was led by Bento Gonçalves da Silva, a military man, and estanciero.

In the following nine years, this first moment of good war performance would suffer changes. Until the year 1840, there was a period of farroupilha ascension, given the victories in the military field, although there were moments of failure, such as the defeat in the Battle of Fanfa Island, in October 1836. From the period of the Proclamation of the Riograndense republic until 1840, the farrapos aimed at the maintenance and organization of the new state. From 1840 on, a period of decline began for the revolting forces. The situation intensified after the meetings of the Constituent Assembly in 1842, when the disagreements between the farrapos leaders and the two groups intensified.

In this clash, the rebellious group acquired great power as the conflict unfolded, mainly due to the removal of Bento Gonçalves from the government in August 1843. At the end of 1841 and the beginning of 1842, concomitant with the installation of Pedro II as Emperor of Brazil, the power to direct the War went into the hands of the "Minority". Because of the emperor's need to use the Rio-Grandense territory for the maintenance of Brazil's southern borders, the movement had a favorable outcome for the revolutionaries. In 1845, despite having the monarch's permission to act violently, Luís Alves de Lima e Silva chose diplomacy. He appealed to the patriotism of the revolutionaries and simultaneously pointed to Manuel Oribe and Juan Manuel de Rosas, presidents of Uruguay and Argentina respectively, as the real enemies. Lima e Silva was acclaimed "pacifier of Brazil" and acquired the title of Count of Caxias, which was attached to the presidency of the Rio Grande do Sul Province.

The Ragamuffin War contributed to the construction of the gaucho's image as a heroic and independent man. This image made possible by the war is praised and cultivated to this day in the region.

== The confrontation ==
Even though the movement led by Canabarro converged on common interests of a liberal nature, there were diverse social, economic, and political interests among the very supporters of the troop. The farrapos were divided into two large groups or parties. The one is known as "Majority", which presented more radical ideas and had as main names: Bento Gonçalves da Silva, Domingos José de Almeida, Mariano de Matos, Antonio de Souza Neto, and Gomes Jardim. The other group was called the "Minority". This one presented a more reformist and less authoritarian behavior and ideas, and some also sought reconciliation with the Central Government. The main name was David Canabarro, but he also had among his supporters, Antonio Vicente da Fontoura, Francisco Ferreira Jardim Brasão, Martins da Silveira Lemos, Onofre Pires, Paulino da Fontoura, and João Antonio de Oliveira.

Besides having different representatives, the two groups had different visions about the directions that the new republic should take. The more radical ones defended the end of slavery while criticizing the monarchy and the Catholic Church. For the more reform-minded and moderate, the demands were more homogeneous: They wanted to maintain slavery, defended Catholicism, and the reintegration of the province to the Empire.

The battle of Porongos occurred in November, and at the end of the war there was still uncertainty as to whether or not the confrontation was arranged with the imperial army. Although the republican movement was almost extinguished, Canabarro was not caught in this military siege, because he was not recognized due to the dirty and torn clothes he wore. According to some accounts, Canabarro would have been warned of Moringue's approach.

According to reports, there is a letter that would have been sent to Colonel Francisco Pedro de Abreu, known as "Chico Pedro" or "Moringue", by the Baron of Caxias instructing Francisco Pedro de Abreu to attack the Black Lancers corps and stating that such a situation would be settled with Canabarro. This letter was shown in Piratini to a professor connected to the other farrapos commanders. The authenticity of the letter was questioned, likely having been forged to demoralize Canabarro, at the time one of the most important military leaders of the Riograndense Republic and one of the peace negotiators on the farrapos side. The document, with Caxias' signature, is recognized as authentic by the Historical Archives of Rio Grande do Sul. Scholars who believe the document to be true argue that this betrayal occurred to speed up and facilitate the peace agreement, as the farrapos were not willing to free the slaves who had fought on their side since this liberation could stimulate the other slaves in the state to rebel. Those who believe in the forgery of these writings argue that the Porongos episode was a surprise for all the members and such a letter was written to generate tension to destroy the group.

The victims of the massacre were the group of black lancers, the only ones killed. The men were separated in the camp between whites, blacks, and Indians. The imperials specifically attacked the black camp and the rest of the men fled. In this battle, Teixeira Nunes, commander of the black lancers, was killed. With this confrontation, the republican revolutionary movement was extinguished and a year later, the Ponche Verde Peace Treaty was decreed. On March 1, 1845, the agreement was signed and among the main points, a highlight is the full amnesty to the survivors of the battle of Porongos, the liberation of the slaves who fought in the Army, and the choice of a new provincial president by the farrapos.

== Black lancers ==
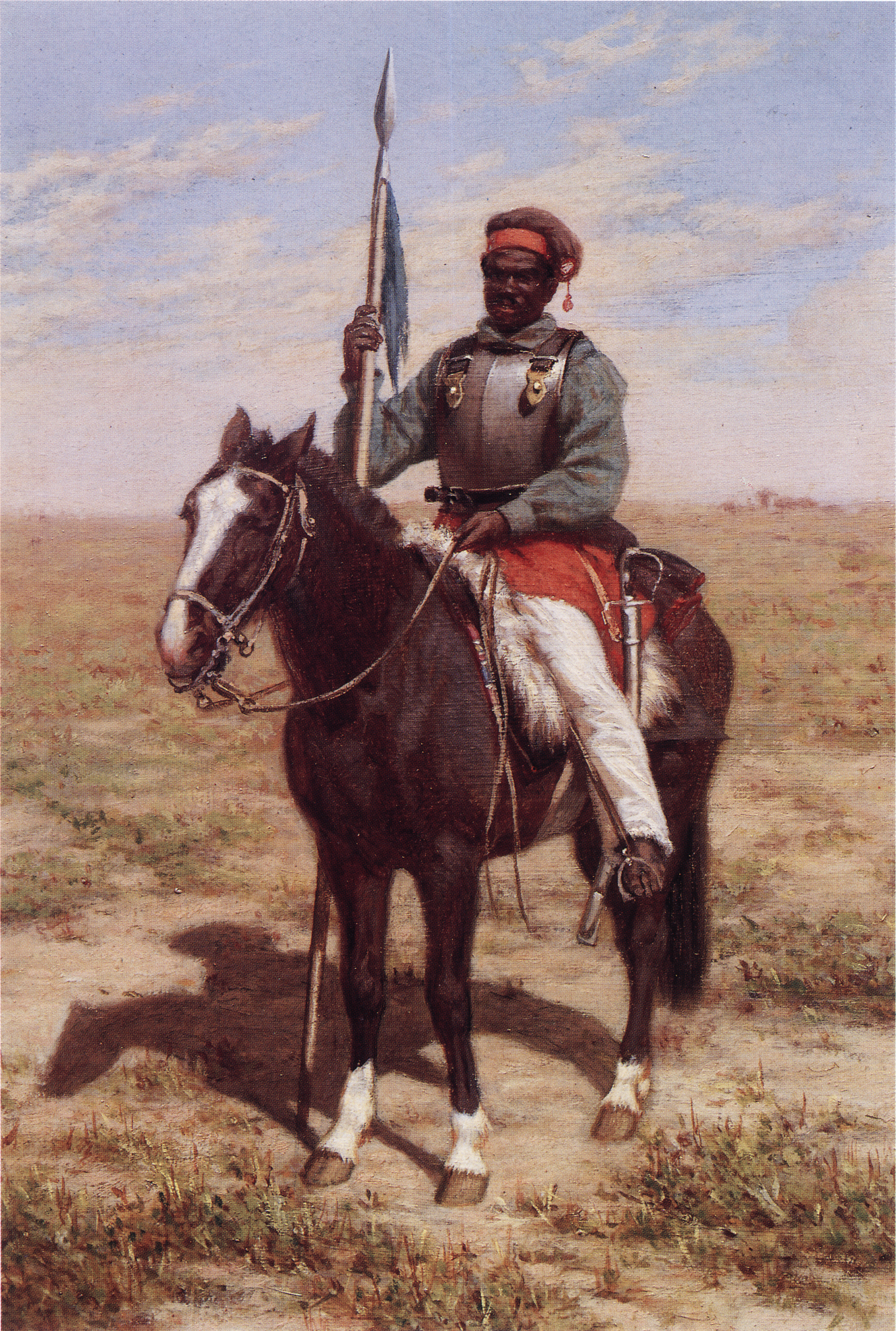
Portrait of a Black Lancer, oil by Juan Manuel Blanes.

The blacks during the Ragamuffin War were fundamental and had active participation throughout the 10 years of the confrontation. It is estimated that, altogether, they represented approximately one-third to one-half of the republican army and were later integrated into the cavalry or infantry groups of the farrapos. The former was created on September 12, 1836, and the latter on August 31, 1838, respectively. On August 31, 1838, 426 combatants joined the army.

They were recruited among the slave champions and tamers of the Tapes and Herval Mountains, located between the municipalities of Canguçu, Piratini, Caçapava, Encruzilhada, and Arroyo Grande, with the promise of liberation after the farrapos' victory. At first, they were commanded by Lieutenant Colonel Joaquim Pedro Soares, later having Major Joaquim Teixeira Nunes as their chief.

Before the creation of the lancers, blacks had played a prominent role in national confrontations, such as the capture of Porto Alegre in 1835 and Pelotas in April 1836. The groups were composed of black and freed slaves, Indians, mestizos, and escaped slaves from other countries, mainly Uruguay. Besides being soldiers and defenders of the farrapos, the blacks also worked as muleteers, messengers, and helped in the manufacture of gunpowder and the cultivation of tobacco and yerba mate, appreciated by the group.

Currently, the Black Lancers are remembered by social movements aiming to highlight the little importance given at the time to the participation of blacks in the conflict. The goal of these groups is to legitimize their actions, and for this, a monument was built in 2004 in the city of Caçapava do Sul.

The Porongos disaster brought Canabarro to a Ragamuffin military tribunal. With the peace in 1845, the case went on for years in military court, and was dismissed in 1866.
