= TV Cachoeira =

- Cachoeira do Sul, Rio Grande do Sul; Brazil
- Channels: Digital: 46 (UHF); Virtual: 11.1

Ownership
- Owner: Seventh-day Adventist Church Rede Novo Tempo de Comunicação; (Televisão Cachoeira do Sul Ltda)

History
- Founded: April 28, 1986
- First air date: December 2, 1987
- Former affiliations: Rede Manchete (through TV Pampa, 1987-1992); Rede Bandeirantes (1992-2000); TV Shop Tour (2000-2011)

Technical information
- Licensing authority: ANATEL
- ERP: 4.7 kW
- Transmitter coordinates: 30°1′12.7″S 52°53′31.8″W

Links
- Public license information: Profile
- Website: https://tvcachoeira.novotempo.com

TV Cachoeira is a Brazilian television station based in Cachoeira do Sul, in the state of Rio Grande do Sul. It broadcasts on channel 11.1 (46 UHF digital), and is an owned-and-operated station of the Rede Novo Tempo de Comunicação, serving as the originating station for TV Novo Tempo programming across most of Brazil. Its studios are located in the city's downtown area, while its transmitters are located in the Poço Comprido neighborhood.

== History ==
The license was granted on April 28, 1986, while the municipality inaugurated the facilities on December 10, 1986. TV Cachoeira started broadcasting on December 2, 1987. At the time, it was a Rede Manchete affiliate, by arrangement with TV Pampa. The station does not have archives of its early years. In 1992, when the Rede Pampa network disaffiliated itself from Rede Manchete, due to strategic reasons, unlike the inland stations of the network, it opted to join Rede Bandeirantes instead.

In July 1998, the license was handed over to Telavo, a group from São Paulo, with the aim of forming a national network. The existing agreement with Bandeirantes was set to be discarded within four months, with the network recouping its loss on a UHF frequency. Under Telavo, the station improved its technological capabilities, as well as usage of the Intelsat F9 satellite to deliver its signal nationwide. At the time of the sale, the station only had one local program, newscast Cachoeira em Foco, shown Mondays to Saturdays at 7:40pm. Telavo had invested in the installation of cable networks in the southern end of the state of Rio de Janeiro and had three television licenses planned in the state, in Porto Alegre, Caxias and Pelotas.

The Telavo deal made the station an affiliate of Shop Tour, a home shopping network. Its programming occupied most of the daily schedule, with its news service being limited to overnight hours. In April 2001, Luiz Antônio Galebe, owner of the network, planned the conversion of its format to include other programming formats, adding news and entertainment. For TV Cachoeira, this implied the expansion of its local programming: a news service on weekdays, a sports program on Saturdays and an interview program on Sundays. The station also planned the production of a national news program, under the tentative title Jornal da Shop Tour, by June, July at latest.

On June 4, 2011, the station ended its affiliation with Galebe's network and joined Novo Tempo, an Adventist network. Shop Tour continued broadcasting on pay television, while the transmitter network, which Novo Tempo inherited, was gradually being retuned to the new network. On January 12, 2015, the station premiered its current newscast, NT Sul.

On November 4, 2017, NT Sul Mais premiered, airing Saturdays at 11:00 p.m. The program featured discussions of the week's major events through special reports and interviews.

In April 14, 2026, following the closure of TV Setorial, the station became the sole originating station for Rede Novo Tempo, serving more than 400 cities.
