= Santa Vitória =

Santa Vitória (holy victory) may refer to:

- the Battle of Santa Vitória, a battle which took place in the state of Rio Grande do Sul
- Santa Vitória do Palmar, a Brazilian municipality in the same state
- Santa Vitória, Minas Gerais, a Brazilian municipality in the state of Minas Gerais

== See also ==
- Vitória (disambiguation)
