= Antônio Vicente da Fontoura =

Brazilian statesman (1807–1860)

Vicente da Fontoura
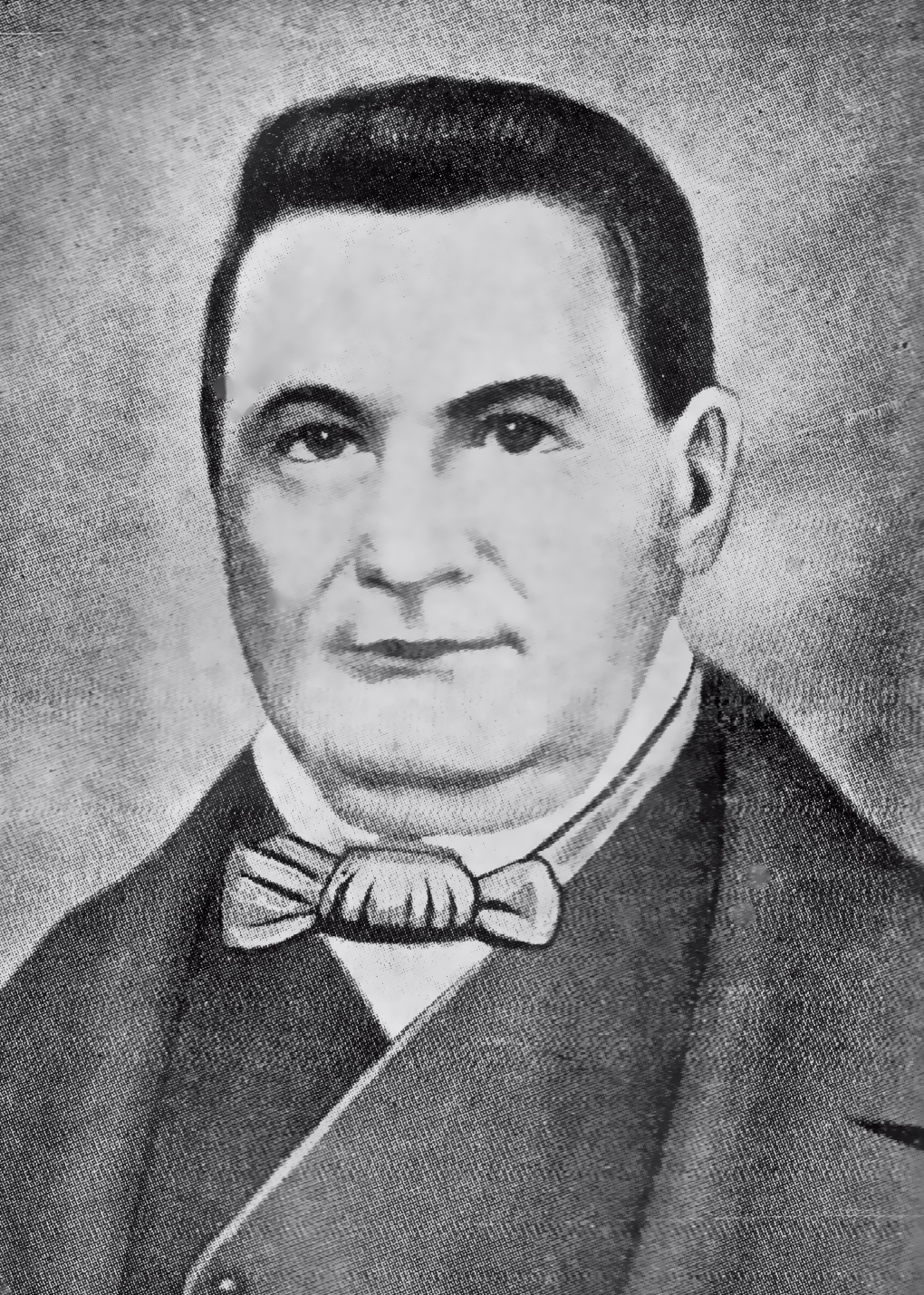

Alderman of Cachoeira do Sul
- In office 1853–1856
- In office 1829–1836

Minister of Exchequer
- In office September 1841 – March 1845
- President: Bento Gonçalves; Gomes Jardim
- Preceded by: Domingos José de Almeida
- Succeeded by: Position abolished

Personal details
- Born: 16 June 1807 Rio Pardo, Rio Grande do Sul, Brazil
- Died: 20 October 1860 (aged 53) Cachoeira do Sul, Rio Grande do Sul, Brazil
- Party: Liberal Party
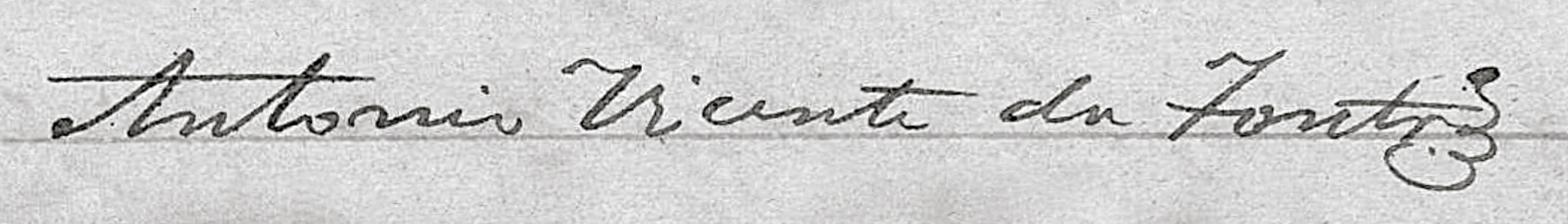
- Signature

Antônio Vicente da Fontoura (16 June 1807 – 20 October 1860) was a Brazilian statesman. He was one of the main political leaders of the Riograndense Republic during the Ragamuffin War (1835–45) and the chief-negotiator of the peace treaty with the Empire of Brazil.

== Background ==
Fontoura was born on June 16, 1807, in the city of Rio Pardo to Eusébio Antônio Gonçalves, a Portuguese land surveyor, and to Vicência Cândida da Fontoura, member of a pioneer family of Rio Grande do Sul, Brazil's southernmost state. He moved to the neighboring town of Cachoeira do Sul as a teenager and started his own retail business in the late 1820s. His involvement in politics started at age 23, when he was elected city Councillor of Cachoeira do Sul.

== Ragamuffin War (1835–45) ==
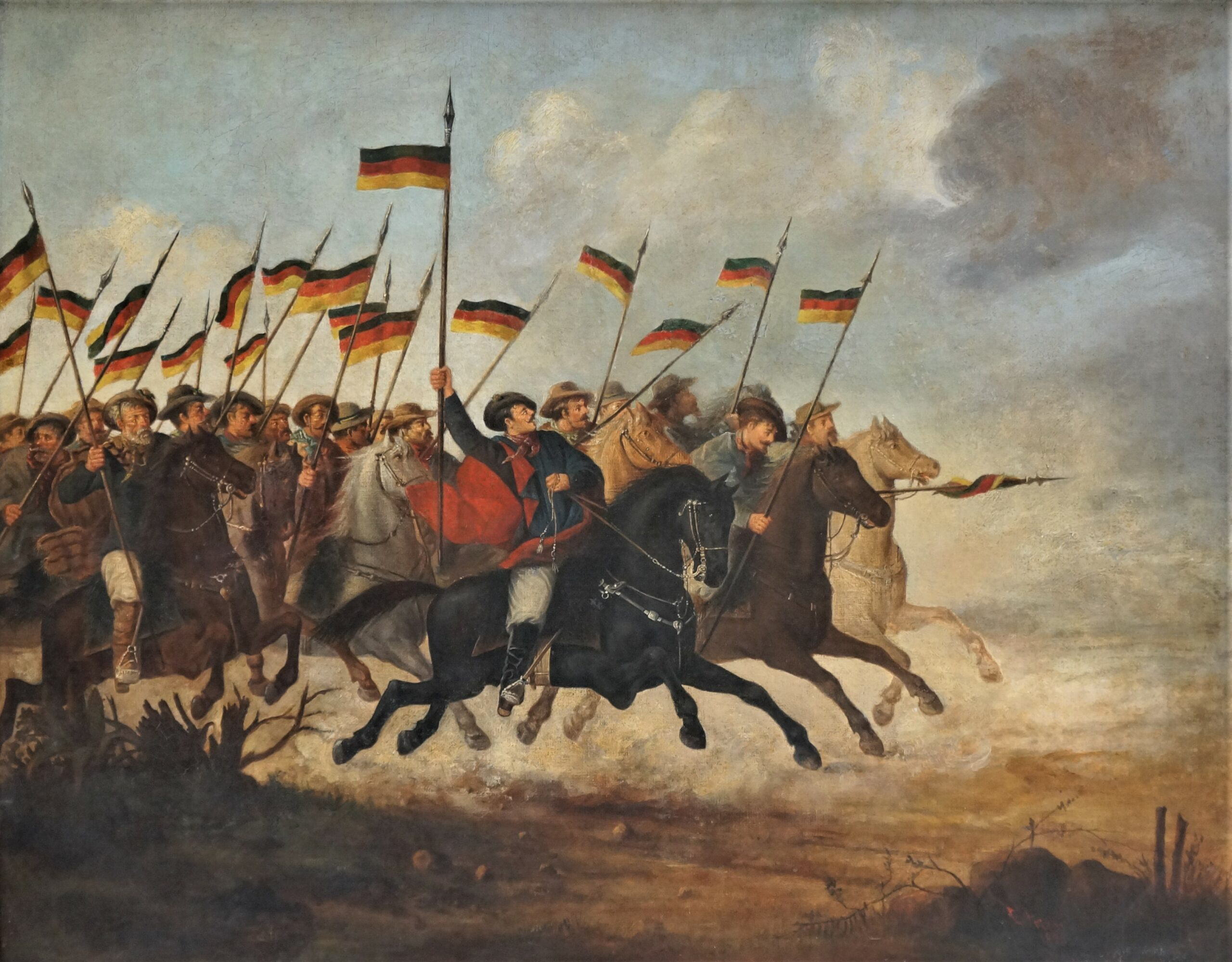
Charge of the Riograndense Army (Júlio de Castilhos Museum, Porto Alegre)

As a businessman linked to the ranching interests of Southern Brazil, Fontoura was a fierce critic of the economic policies of the Brazilian central government, which favored the commodity exporting zones of the country to the detriment of the domestic-oriented economy of Rio Grande do Sul. At the same time, as a freemason and reader of liberal philosophers, Fontoura had an ingrained antipathy towards the monarchical regime of Brazil.

At the onset of the Ragamuffin War, on September 20, 1835, Fontoura joined the rebels and took over the command of the state militia in Rio Pardo and Cachoeira do Sul. He was appointed Minister of Finance of the Riograndense Republic in 1841. Elected to the Constitutional Assembly of 1842–43, he progressively became the leader of an opposition party to the main military commander of the uprising, Bento Gonçalves da Silva. In spite of his Republican ideals, Fontoura was not a supporter of the independence of Rio Grande do Sul at any cost. As the war evolved, he got convinced that a diplomatic effort would be preferable to a military escalation of the conflict, which would even further damage the state economy.

== Chief-negotiator of the Peace of Ponche Verde ==
In late 1844, all rebel leaders rallied behind Fontoura and chose him as chief-negotiator of the talks with the Brazilian central government. Sent to Rio de Janeiro, then capital of the Brazilian Empire, he managed to negotiate an agreement that allowed a peaceful and honorable reintegration of Rio Grande do Sul into Brazil. While in Rio, notwithstanding his appeasement attitude, Fontoura refused to kiss the hand of Emperor Pedro II, stating that he was "not yet a Brazilian subject".

Signed on March 1, 1845, the Peace Agreement of Ponche Verde granted amnesty to the Republican leaders, provided financial compensation for Rio Grande do Sul and assured the emancipation of all African slaves serving in the Riograndense Army.

== Late years ==
After the end of the war, Fontoura went back to the politics of Cachoeira do Sul, as leader of the Liberal Party, and to his retail business. On the local election day of September 8, 1860, he was stabbed at a political rally and died the following month.
