= TV Setorial =

- Pindamonhangaba, São Paulo; Brazil
- Channels: Analog: 15; Digital: 15 (UHF); Virtual: 30.1

Ownership
- Owner: Seventh-day Adventist Church Rede Novo Tempo de Comunicação; (Fund Setorial de Radiodifusão Educ de Sons e Imagens)

History
- Founded: 1994
- First air date: 29 November 1996
- Last air date: 8 April 2026
- Former affiliations: TVE Brasil (1996-2006); TV Cultura (1996-2006)

Technical information
- Licensing authority: ANATEL
- ERP: 0.25 kW

TV Setorial (channel 15 analog; channel 30 digital) was a TV Novo Tempo-affiliated television station licensed to Pindamonhangaba, covering 37 municipalities in the Paraíba Valley. The station was owned by Rede Novo Tempo, the Brazilian media group of the Seventh-Day Adventist Church.

== History ==
Fundação Setorial de Radiodifusão Educativa de Sons e Imagens (or TV Setorial Vale do Paraíba) was created in 1990 with the entry of its license request.

In 1994, the station was authorized by the Communications Ministry to operate on over-the-air television, through UHF channel 15. The station was officially inaugurated on 29 November 1996, as a joint TVE Brasil and TV Cultura affiliate.

TV Setorial received its charter license on 4 April 2002, thus broadcasting local programs for 24 hours a day.

On 12 April 2006, TV Setorial was acquired by Adventist media group Rede Novo Tempo de Comunicação, whose administrative headquarters are located in Jacareí, São Paulo. With the acquisition, it started airing a half-hour local newscast, Jornal Daqui.

Jornal Daqui ended on 28 March 2009, with its weekly summary. On 29 March, it was relaced by NT Vale, also lasting a half-hour; its new news portal launched on 1 December 2013.

In May 2016, it started digital broadcasts in Pindamonhangaba, on channel 30.

As of September 2020, a substantial amount of its archives (3,000 VHS and S-VHS tapes) dating back to 1995 were donated to Rede Cidade de Comunicação e Cidadania, owner of TV Cidade Taubaté.

The station shut down on 8 April 2026, becoming a mere relay of TV Cachoeira, causing the firing of its ten remaining staff, but keeping the license on air. Among the motivations were the strict rules to keep it on air, since its license put it as an educational station.

== Notable staff ==
- Michelle Sampaio (now with TV Vanguarda São José dos Campos)
