= Guaíba =

Municipality of Rio Grande do Sul, Brazil

- City
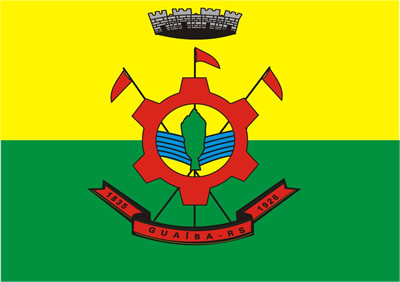
- Flag Coat of arms
- Motto: People building citizenship
- Location in Rio Grande do Sul, Brazil

- Location in Brazil
- Coordinates: 30°07′06″S 51°19′17″W
- Country: Brazil
- Region: South
- State: Rio Grande do Sul
- Demonym: guaibense
- Founded: October 14, 1926

Government
  - Mayor: José Sperotto (PTB)

Area
  - Total: 376.79 km^{2} (145.48 sq mi)
- Elevation: 23 m (75 ft)

Population (2020)
  - Total: 98,239
  - Density: 260.73/km^{2} (675.28/sq mi)
- Time zone: UTC−3 (BRT)
- Website: Prefeitura de Guaíba

Guaíba is a city located in the Metropolitan Porto Alegre of Porto Alegre, in the Brazilian state of Rio Grande do Sul. The city is on the shores of the Guaíba Lake.

== History ==
In the current territory of the municipality of Guaíba there have been archaeological discoveries of elements representing Guaraní culture, the oldest found in the region. These indigenous settlements would have been settled between 10000 and 6000 BCE (Laroque 2002).

There is conclusive evidence of multiple conflicts between the indigenous peoples of the area and the colonial-era Portuguese on the land where Guaíba currently stands, with the indigenous incurring substantial losses while trying to defend their land.

The border disputes in between the Spanish and Portugueses thrones also involved the strategic land on which Guaíba now sits. The Portuguese had used a system of quickly distributing land to new settlers called the sesmaria in what was considered contested territory, but the new beneficiaries of this system helped Portugal consolidate their rule over what is now Rio Grande do Sul.

== Sesmaria ==
After a 1776 victory over Spain, Portugal gained control over a wide area of land definitively, and sesmarias were distributed in the region where Guaíba is today. Antônio Ferreira Leitão officially acquired the lands of modern-day Guaíba in 1793. His daughter married José Gomes de Vasconcelos Jardim, who was Vice-President of the briefly independent Riograndense Republic.

One generation later, during the Farroupilha Rebellion launched by the people of Rio Grande do Sul against the Brazilian Empire, revolutionary forces to plan their attack the night before they were to take over Porto Alegre on 19 September 1835. People involved in the traditionalist gaúcho (Rio Grande do Sul) movement in the 1960s named Guaíba the "cradle of the Ragamuffin War" (in Portuguese, Revolução Farroupilha).

== Pedras Brancas ==
Evidence indicates that the village of Pedras Brancas began in the second half of the 19th century, since the area was a necessary stopping point from inland Rio Grande do Sul and the capital. Meat processing facilities grew and the settlement involved slaves, peons and cattle ranchers. The lands of modern-day Guaíba were a necessary transit point for people from the South or West of the state heading to Porto Alegre.

To cross the Guaíba lake to Porto Alegre, one had to travel by boat. Indigenous boats had been doing the crossing for generations but by the late 19th century steamboats had become the most common vehicle used to cross.

The name Pedras Brancas (White Stones in English) is linked to the rock formations of the region which formed approximately 600 million years ago that include some of the oldest types of stones on the planet, including monolithic granite blocks. This type of rock is shown in the shield of the Riograndense Republic.

== Beginning of urbanization ==
According to the writer Fernando Worm, the Church of Nossa Senhora do Livramento was founded by imperial decree by Emperor Dom Pedro II on 17 February 1857. The land for the church was donated by Isabel Leonor, daughter of Antônio Ferreira Leitão and wife of José Gomes Jardim, as part of a promise she had made to Mary in order that her and her child's lives would be protected. At this time, the chapel of the Pedras Brancas District was elevated to Freguesia status, marking the settlement's transition into being a town.

In 1860, there was the first demarcations of property lines and attributions of street names, marking the beginning of urbanization.

In Rio Grande do Sul, the flow of immigrants restarted after the end of the 1845 Farroupilha War. Groups of Polish, Italian and German colonizers arrived to what was then called Serra do Herval, and a distribution of lots in 1888 involved over 200 parcels of land. Later, the town was called Vila Bela, then Serro Negro, and finally Mariana Pimentel.

The colony of Sertão Santana was created by an initiative of immigrants of primarily German heritage, who dedicated themselves to small-scale agriculture of products such as sweet potato, tobacco, rice, corn, and limited animal husbandry.

In 1926, the collection of towns and colonies including those mentioned were administratively broken off from being part of the 9th, 10th, and 11th districts of Porto Alegre (Pedras Brancas, Barra do Ribeiro and Mariana Pimentel) and made into the Municipality of Guaíba, named after the body of water which separates it from Porto Alegre.

== Geography ==
Guaíba is located on the west side of the Guaíba, a lake which receives five rivers and carries them towards the Atlantic Ocean via the Lagoa dos Patos. It is also at the crossroad of two federal highways that link Brazil with Argentina and Uruguay, putting it at advantage for investments that seek to target the market of these Mercosul nations. The city is less than thirty minutes from Salgado Filho International Airport, which allows quick access for interests of agribusiness, industry, tourism and commerce.

The territory of Guaíba is mostly flat and close to the lake, but there are a few noteworthy hills.

The climate of Guaíba is subtropical, given that the city is located south of the Tropic of Capricorn. However, the seasons are strongly distinguished, with a remarkable heat in the summer and fairly moderate winters. Approximately 1400 mm of precipitation falls annually, although in the summer the Guaíba lake often ends up receding below normal levels.

== Economy ==
There are a number of large industrial companies with a presence in Guaíba, such as Celulose Riograndense, Sulfato Rio Grande, Santher, ThyssenKrupp among others as well as a Toyota distribution center. Much of the commerce is centered on São José Street, in terms of consumer goods such as home appliances, electronics and furniture.

=== Health ===
There are two medical clinics in the center of the municipality that deal with issues of both basic and specialized care, and there are seven basic clinics in peripheral regions of Guaíba, all maintained as part of the public health care system. The Municipal Secretary of Health is also a participant in programs to reduce infant mortality (Guaíba Abaça a Família), to lower rates of hypertension and diabetes, and to deliver specialized treatments to patients with STIs or AIDS, among others.

== Tourism ==
There are various places worth visiting in Guaíba. The old cinema has closed, but in its place there is the Carlos Nobre Museum. Various events occur year-round in the city center's Praça da Bandeira. There is currently a garden walk drawn up by the local tourism board of places to see in the city. One of the more popular things to do, particularly on the weekend, is to walk along the shores of the Guaíba Lake, where one can see people of every background walking about.

== Population ==
=== By year ===
Historical population
| Year | Pop. | ±% |
|---|---|---|
| 1970 | 33,680 | — |
| 1980 | 55,054 | +63.5% |
| 1991 | 83,080 | +50.9% |
| 1996 | 85,969 | +3.5% |
| 2000 | 94,307 | +9.7% |
| 2007 | 93,578 | −0.8% |
| 2010 | 95,230 | +1.8% |
| 2020 | 98,239 | +3.2% |

=== By Age ===
| 0 to 4 | 5 to 9 | 10 to 19 | 20 to 29 | 30 to 39 | 40 to 49 | 50 to 59 | over 60 |
|---|---|---|---|---|---|---|---|
| 9% | 9% | 20% | 17% | 16% | 13% | 8% | 8% |

== See also ==
- List of municipalities in Rio Grande do Sul

== Sources ==
- Revista Rio Grande Cultura. Porto Alegre, março/abril/97 Ano IX-23, FEPLAM, p. 21
- Jornal Correio do Povo – Ano 1926
- Arquivo do Museu Carlos Nobre
- SANT'ANA, Carlos Affonso. Abrindo Baús: Gente e Crônicas da Terra Guaibense.1997.150p
- ZIULKOSKI, Carlos . Aspectos Históricos de Mariana Pimentel - 1991
- WORM, Fernando. Guaíba Terra e Povo. Livrarias Globo, Porto Alegre, 1974.121p.
- LAROQUE, Luís Fernando da Silva. Guaíba no Contexto Histórico – Arqueológico do Rio Grande do Sul. Guaíba.Ed. do Autor, 2002.192p.
- LUTZNBERGER, José. A Paisagem ao Redor de Porto Alegre. 1982.
- VELLINHO, Moysés. Capitania d'El Rei. Aspectos Polêmicos da Formação Riograndense. 2ª Ed.Editora Globo, Porto Alegre, 1970,241p.
- RODRIGUES, Valdivino. Uma Imigração Suíço – Valesana em Guaíba. 2004.
