= Gomes Jardim =

Brazilian farmer (1773–1854)

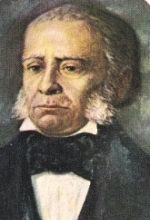

President of the Riograndense Republic
- In office 1841–1845
- Preceded by: Bento Gonçalves da Silva
- Succeeded by: Office abolished

Vice-president of the Riograndense Republic
- In office 1836–1841
- President: Bento Gonçalves da Silva
- Preceded by: Office created

Personal details
- Born: 1 January 1773 Triunfo, Rio Grande do Sul, State of Brazil
- Died: 1 December 1854 (aged 81)
- Spouse: Isabel Leonor Ferreira Leitão

José Gomes de Vasconcelos Jardim (Note: With Portuguese writing conventions at the time, Joze Gomes de Vasconcellos Jardim.) (1 January 1773 – 1 December 1854) was a Brazilian farmer, freemason, medical doctor, and militant. He was the president of the Riograndense Republic during the Ragamuffin War, succeeding his cousin Bento Gonçalves da Silva on an interim basis until the end of the war and the dissolution of the republic.

Gomes Jardim participated in the rebellion from the beginning. The plans to capture the city of Porto Alegre, which started the war, were made on his property in the estancia of Pedras Brancas, around what is now the city of Guaíba. Local legend often recalled that the plans were made under the shade of the Farroupilha Cypress on 19 September 1835. After Bento Gonçalves was imprisoned after the Battle of Fanfa, Gomes Jardim took up the role as president on an interim basis. Bento Gonçalves later died in Gomes Jardim's house on 18 July 1847. The house was later listed as a historical landmark by the Institute of Artistic and Historical Heritage of Rio Grande do Sul on 30 November 1994.

Gomes Jardim was married to Isabel Leonor Ferreira Leitão, whose father Antônio Ferreira Leitão owned the land that would later become Guaíba.
