= Recapture of Laguna =

1839 battle of the Ragamuffin War

- Part of the Ragamuffin War
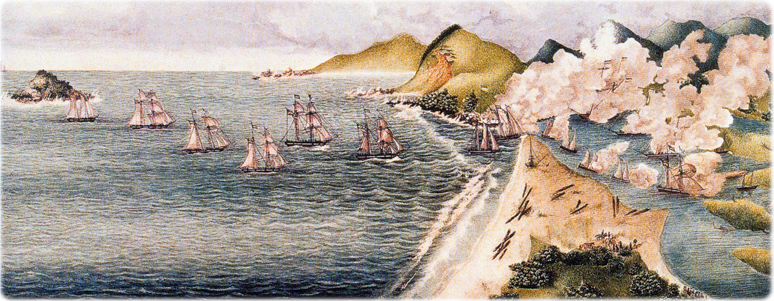
- A Retomada de Laguna, by Rafael Mendes de Carvalho, c. 1840
Date	15 November 1839
Location	Laguna, Santa Catarina, Empire of Brazil 28°29′49″S 48°45′41″W
Result	Imperial victory

Belligerents
Juliana Republic	Empire of Brazil

Commanders and leaders
David Canabarro; Giuseppe Garibaldi	Fernandes dos Santos; Frederico Mariath

Strength
1,200 men 5 warships Total guns: 10	3,000 men 14 warships Total guns: 31

Casualties and losses
200 dead 1 ship sunk 3 ships captured 2 ships destroyed 5 guns captured	17 dead 38 wounded

The Recapture of Laguna was a battle which took place in 15 November 1839 between the rebel Juliana Republic and the Empire of Brazil, during the Ragamuffin War. Laguna was the breakaway republic's capital, and the rebel defeat in this battle meant it was captured and the Juliana Republic vanquished.

== Background ==
The Ragamuffin War was a rebellion which had raged in southern Brazil since 1835; they at times controlled large parts of the province of Rio Grande do Sul, and in July 1839 pushed into Santa Catarina; after they captured the city of Laguna, they founded a new breakaway republic, the Juliana Republic, in confederation with the already extant Riograndense Republic to the south. Over the next few months, superior Imperial forces encroached the new republic and eventually converged into the capital, Laguna, where the republic's first president, David Canabarro, lay awaiting with his army.

== Engagement ==
Colonel José Fernandes dos Santos Pereira commanded the Imperial troops on land, while the Republican defenders, 1,200 men strong, awaited them. On Laguna's southern shore, Giuseppe Garibaldi commanded three schooners, the Rio Pardo, Caçapava and Itaparica, a gunboat, the Lagunense, and a launch, the Santana; there also were 9 guns at a coastal fort protecting the harbor's entrance. Soon after the battle began on sea, when Imperial commander Frederico Mariath attacked through the southern shore, Canabarro ordered a withdrawal on land, seeing that his men were hopelessly outnumbered.

The Imperial naval force was composed of five gunboats, four launches, two pataches, the São José and the Desterro, two brigs, the Eolo and the Cometa, a schooner, the Bela Americana, totaling 31 guns to the republican flotilla's 10.

After three hours of fighting, the Republicans who had stood had been soundly defeated, and those who had survived attempted to flee towards Rio Grande do Sul, where the Riograndense Republic still stood.

Garibaldi described the battle thus: "The battle was terrible and more deadly that one could believe. We did not lose too many men because most of the garrison was on land; but, however, of the six officers in three ships I was the only one who survived. All of our guns were disabled; but after this happened we kept fighting with rifles and did not stop firing while the enemy passed ahead of us. It was truly a butchery of human meat; one would step over torsos separated from their heads; on each step one tripped over random body parts. The Itaparica's commander, João Henrique, of Laguna, found himself lying down, amidst two thirds of his crew, with a bullet that made a hole in the middle of his chest, wide enough for an arm to go through. Poor John Griggs had his body cut in half by a shell, taken from close range." (Note: This is a translation from the original Portuguese, which reads: "o combate foi terrível e mais mortífero do que se podia crer. Não perdemos muita gente porque mais da metade da guarnição estava em terra; entretanto, dos seis oficiais existentes nos três navios eu fui o único que sobreviveu. Todas as nossas peças foram desmontadas; mas ainda depois de desmontadas as peças o combate continuou à espingarda e não cessamos de atirar durante todo o tempo em que passou diante de nós o inimigo. Era um verdadeiro açougue de carne humana; pisava-se sobre bustos separados dos corpos; a cada passo tropeçava-se em membros dispersos. O comandante do Itaparica, João Henrique, do Laguna, achava-se deitado, no meio de dois terços de sua equipagem, com uma bala que lhe fazia, no meio do peito, um buraco capaz de deixar passar um braço. O pobre João Griggs ficara com o corpo cortado em dois por um tiro de metralha, recebido à queima-roupa.")
