= Capture of Laguna =

- Part of the Ragamuffin War
Date	22 July 1839
Location	Laguna, Santa Catarina, Empire of Brazil
Result	Republican victory

Belligerents
Riograndense Republic	Empire of Brazil

Commanders and leaders
David Canabarro; Giuseppe Garibaldi; John Griggs	Vicente Vilas-Boas

Strength
1,000 men 2 launches Total guns: 8	1,000 men 2 schooners 3 launches Total guns: ~16

Casualties and losses
1 dead	17 dead 77 captured 2 launches captured 1 schooner captured 1 launch destroyed

The Capture of Laguna was a battle between the rebel Riograndense Republic and the Empire of Brazil during the Ragamuffin War, taking place on 22 July 1839 in Laguna in Santa Catarina.

== Background ==
The Ragamuffin War had been going on since 1835 and the breakaway Riograndense Republic had control over no ports; this gave rise to the idea of an invasion of the province of Santa Catarina to the north, and specifically the conquest of Laguna, a coastal city which they knew to be only lightly fortified.

== Engagement ==
David Canabarro commanded a troop of men, and Giuseppe Garibaldi and John Griggs commanded two launches, Seival and Farroupilha II, which had been transported overland from the Lagoa dos Patos to the mouth of the Tramandaí River. The Imperial garrison, aware of the impending arrival of the rebel force, expected an attack by day and directly to the port, but the attack came at night and through the south. After the rebel launches were spotted, two out of the five Imperial ships opened fire against them, and they replied in kind. Eventually, one of the Imperial ships ran aground and was set on fire by its crewmen, and the other captured.

Soon afterwards, Canabarro arrived with his troops, but only engaged the defenders after sunrise. Colonel Vilas-Boas, the Imperial commander, ordered a withdrawal, seeing that his forces were inferior. Out of the five Imperial warships in the region at the beginning of the battle, only the launch Cometa under his command managed to escape.

A few days after this victory, Canabarro proclaimed a new breakaway state, the Juliana Republic.
