= Cachoeira do Sul =

Municipality of Rio Grande do Sul, Brazil

- Municipality
- Municipality of Cachoeira do Sul
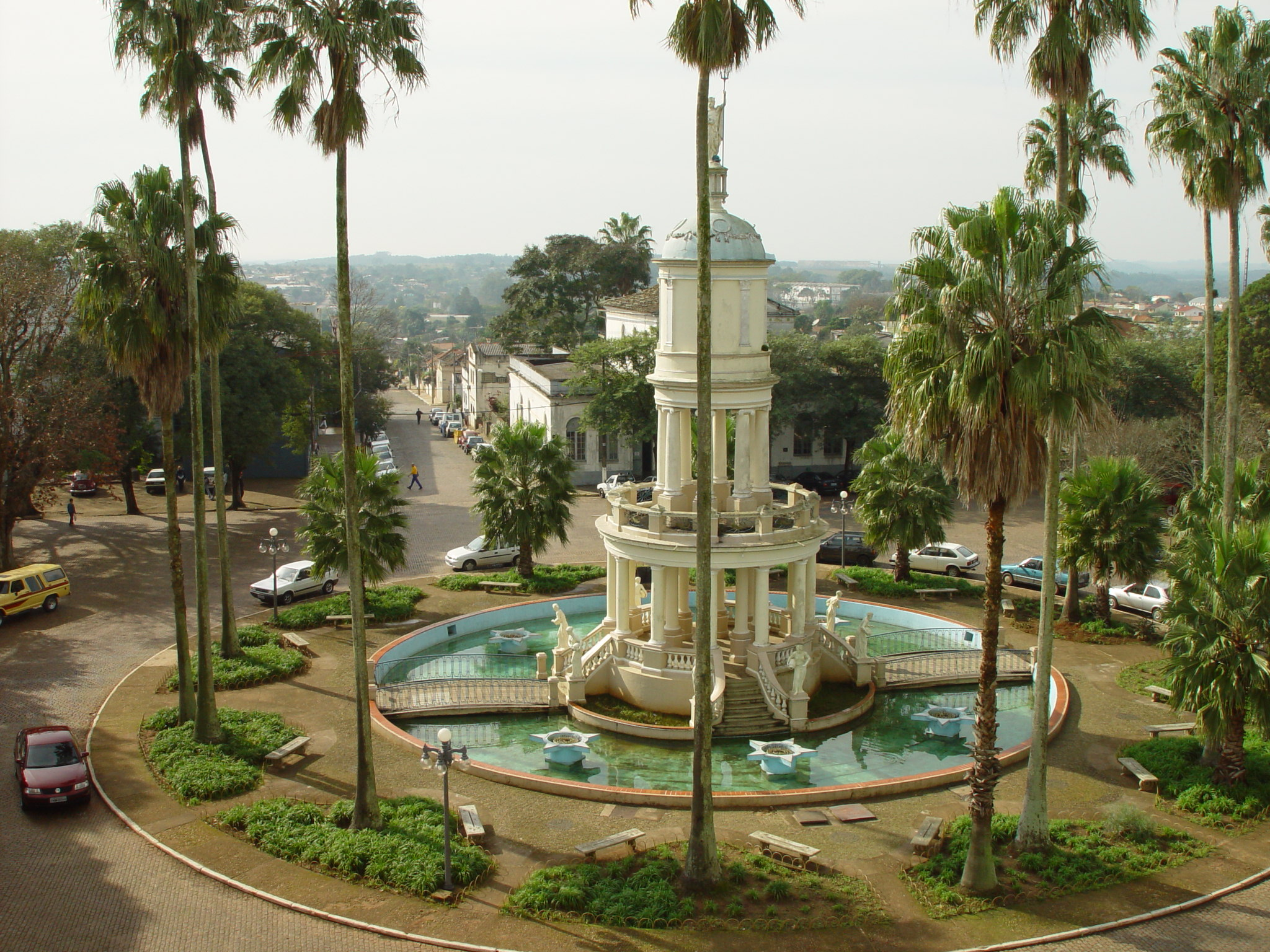
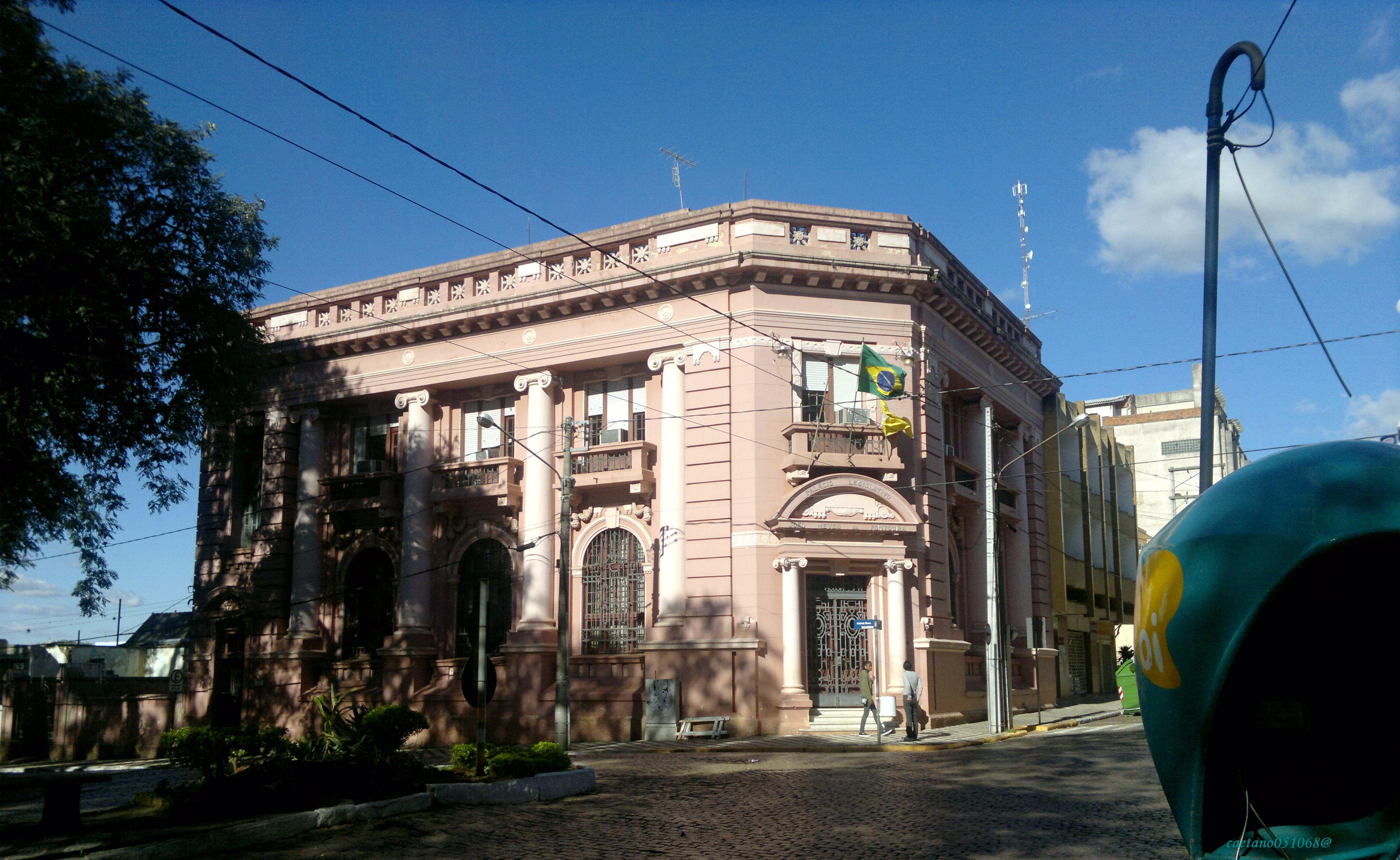
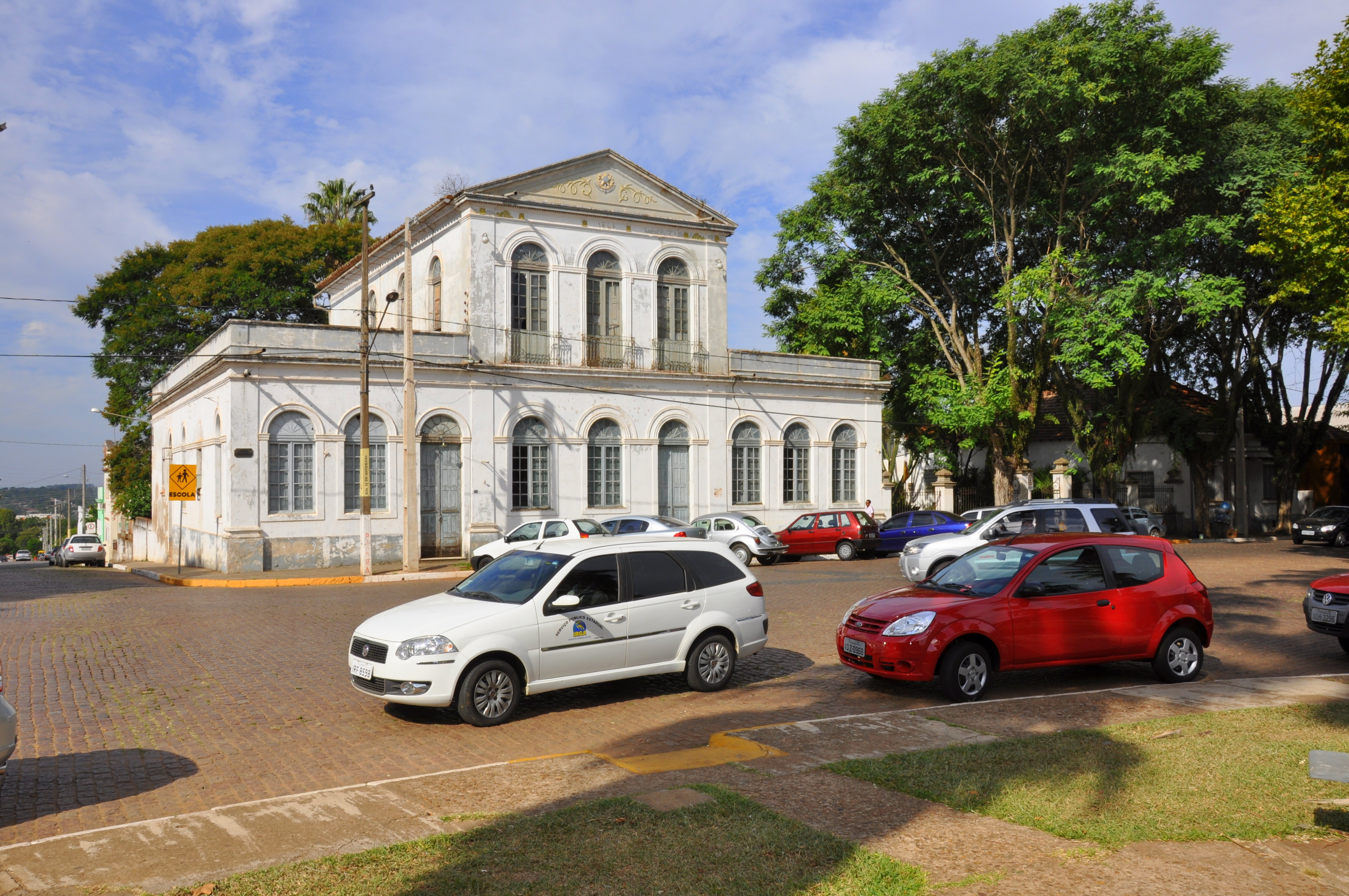
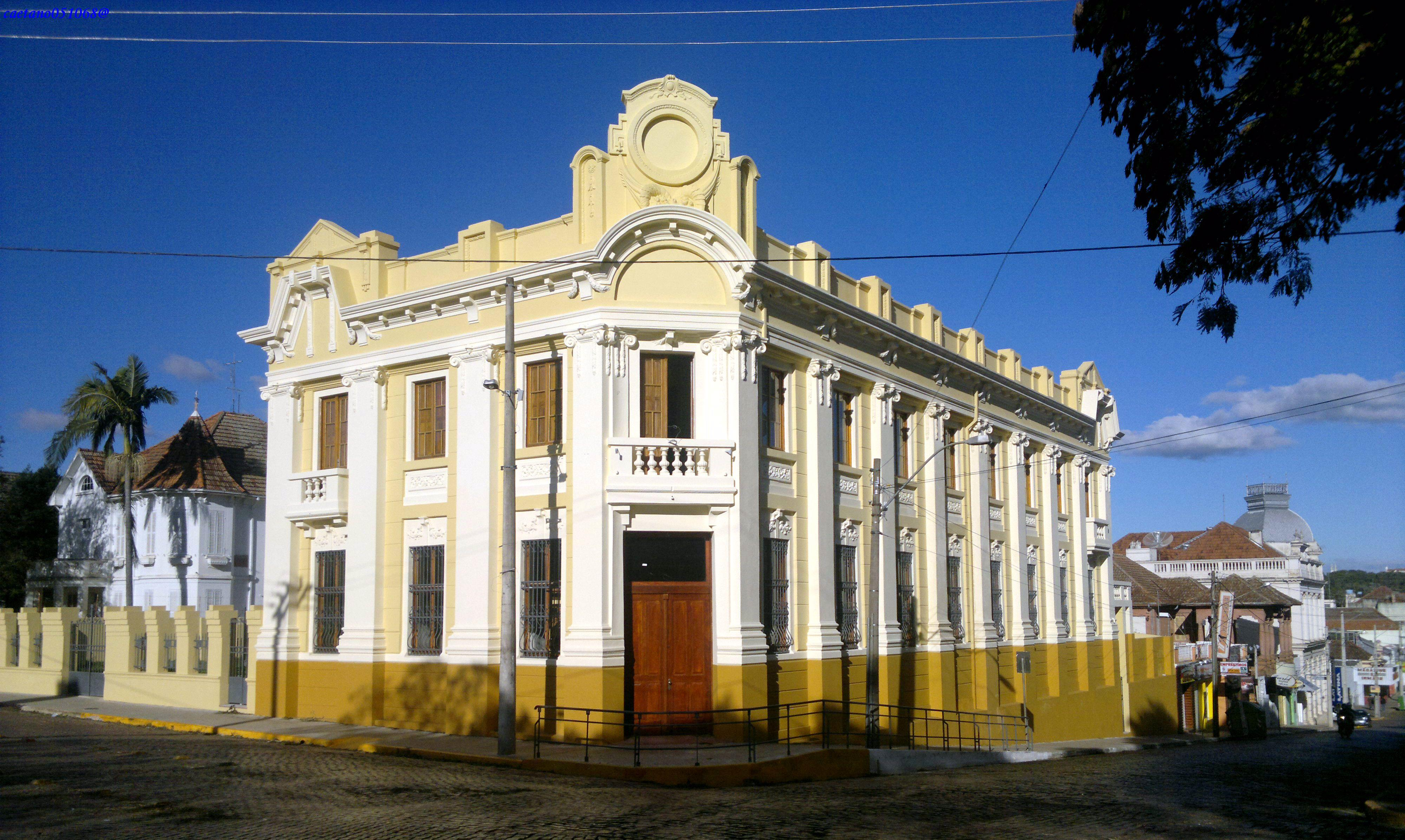
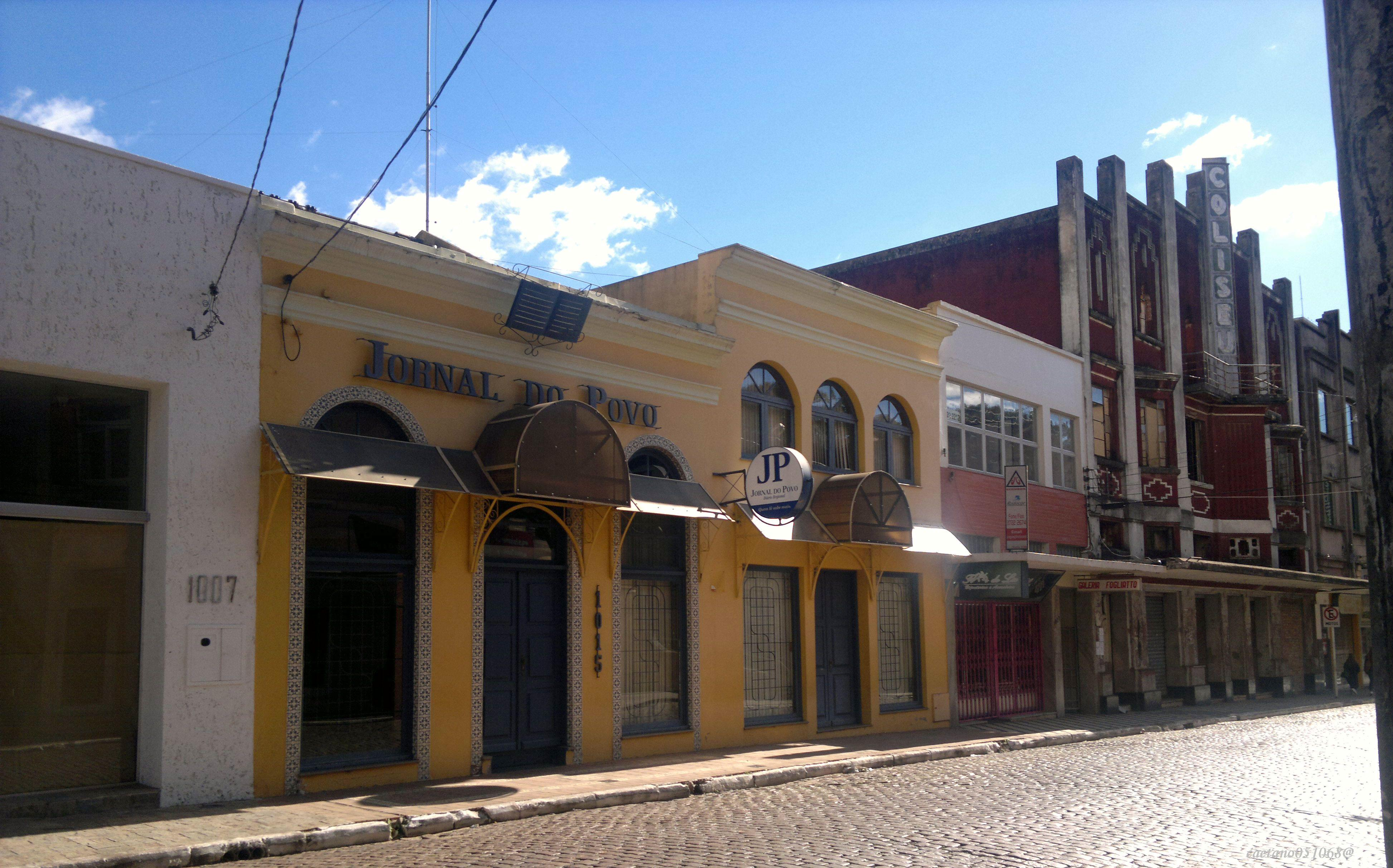
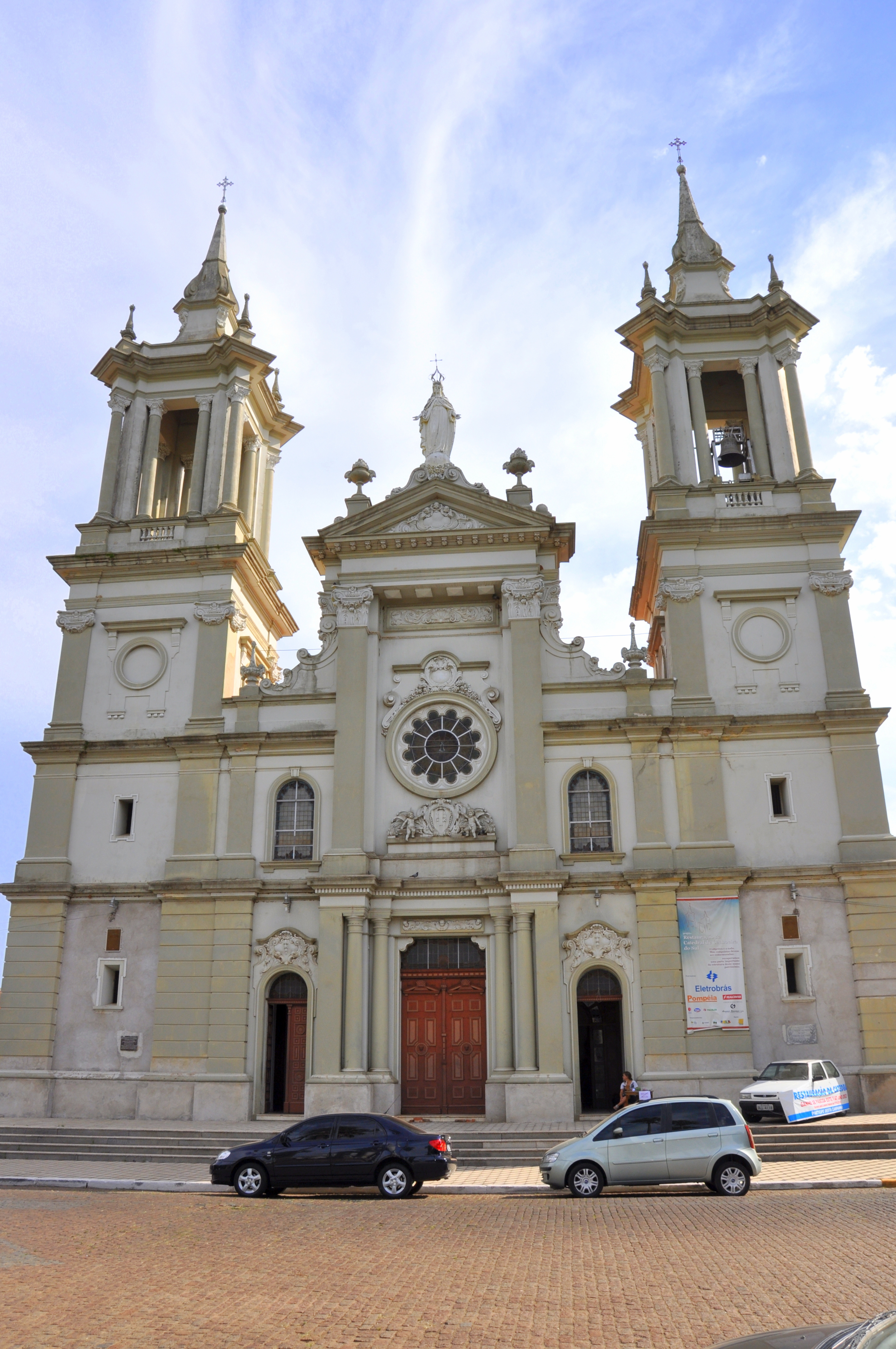

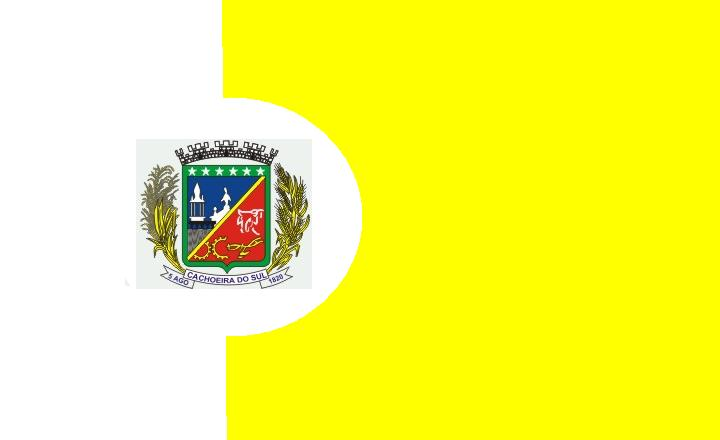
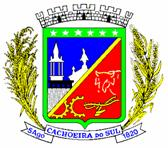
- Flag Coat of arms
- Nickname: Capital Nacional do Arroz "National Rice Capital"
- Location within Rio Grande do Sul
- Coordinates: 30°02′21″S 52°53′38″W
- Country: Brazil
- Region: South
- State: Rio Grande do Sul
- Founded: 1820

Government
  - Mayor: José Otávio Germano (PP)

Area
  - Total: 3,715 km^{2} (1,434 sq mi)
- Elevation: 68 m (223 ft)

Population (2022)
  - Total: 80,070
  - Density: 21.55/km^{2} (55.82/sq mi)
- Time zone: UTC−3 (BRT)
- HDI (2010): 0.742 – high
- Website: www.cachoeiradosul.rs.gov.br

Cachoeira do Sul (Portuguese pronunciation: [kaʃuˈe(j)ɾɐ du ˈsuw]) is a municipality in the state of Rio Grande do Sul, southernmost Brazil.

Its Marian Catedral da Nossa Senhora da Conceição is the episcopal see of the Roman Catholic Diocese of Cachoeira do Sul.

== Geography ==
It is located at a latitude of 30º02'21" S and a longitude of 52º53'38" W, at an approximate elevation of 68 meters above sea level. Its population in 2020 was approximately 81,869 and its area is 3715.5 square kilometers.

=== Climate ===
Cachoeira do Sul has a humid subtropical climate and its annual average temperature is 18.9 °C (66.0 °F). In January, the warmest month, highs frequently surpass 30 °C (86 °F) with the average low dropping to 19 °C (66 °F). In June, the coldest month, highs reach 19 °C (66 °F) and lows usually go below 9 °C (48 °F), reaching up to −5 °C (23 °F), but snow is a rare occurrence. Rainfall is distributed evenly throughout the year with a monthly average of 140 millimetres (5.5 in).

== Sports ==
There are two soccer teams in Cachoeira do Sul, Grêmio Esportivo São José and Cachoeira Futebol Clube they both play at the Joaquim Vidal Stadium.

== Notable people ==
- Alexandre Garcia, journalist
- Antônio Vicente da Fontoura, leaders of the Riograndense Republic
- Thomas John McCann, MD (Retired) of Lister Machine Tools, international Christian speaker
- Luisinho Netto, soccer player
- Nelson Aerts, tennis player
- Roberto Linck, soccer player and owner of Linck Group
