= Juliana Republic =

Short-lived republic in 19th century Brazil

Coordinates: 28°28′S 48°46′W

Free and Independent Catarinense Republic República Catarinense Livre e Independente
- 1839
- Flag Coat of arms
- Motto: Liberdade, Igualdade, Humanidade (Portuguese for "Liberty, Equality, Humanity.")
- Location of Santa Catarina in present day Brazil
- Status: Unrecognized state
- Capital: Laguna
- Common languages: Portuguese
- Government: Presidential republic
- President
  - 29 July–7 August: David Canabarro
  - 7 August–15 November: Vicente Ferreira dos Santos Cordeiro
- History
  - Established: 29 July 1839
  - Disestablished: 15 November 1839
Preceded by	Succeeded by
Empire of Brazil	Empire of Brazil
- Today part of: Brazil

The Juliana Republic (Portuguese: República Juliana) or the Catarinense Republic (República Catarinense), fully and officially the Free and Independent Catarinense Republic (República Catarinense Livre e Independente), was a revolutionary state that existed between 29 July and 15 November 1839, in the province of Santa Catarina of the Empire of Brazil. The Republic was proclaimed in an extension of the Ragamuffin War started in the neighboring province of Rio Grande do Sul, where the Rio-Grandense Republic had already been created.

Forces of the revolutionary Riograndense Republic, led by General David Canabarro and Italian revolutionary Giuseppe Garibaldi, with help from the local population, conquered the harbor city of Laguna on 22 July 1839, in a battle known as the Capture of Laguna. The Catarinense Republic was then proclaimed on 29 July, at the city's municipal chamber. Canabarro assumed temporarily the office of president until an electoral college was assembled and elections were held on 7 August. For president and vice president were elected, respectively, Joaquim Xavier Neves, a Lieutenant-colonel of the National Guard of São José, and his uncle, the priest Vicente Ferreira dos Santos Cordeiro, who assumed the presidential office due to a blockade by the Imperial Army that prevented Joaquim Xavier Neves from reaching Laguna.

The rebels could not conquer the provincial capital of Nossa Senhora do Desterro (present-day Florianópolis) because their naval forces were found and destroyed by the Imperial Brazilian Navy at Massiambu River (on the continent, south of Santa Catarina Island) while the rebels were preparing to attack Nossa Senhora do Desterro. Largely due to this, the Juliana Republic lasted for only four months. In November, imperial forces took the Julian capital of Laguna.
