= Laguna, Santa Catarina =

Laguna
- Municipality
- Municipality of Laguna
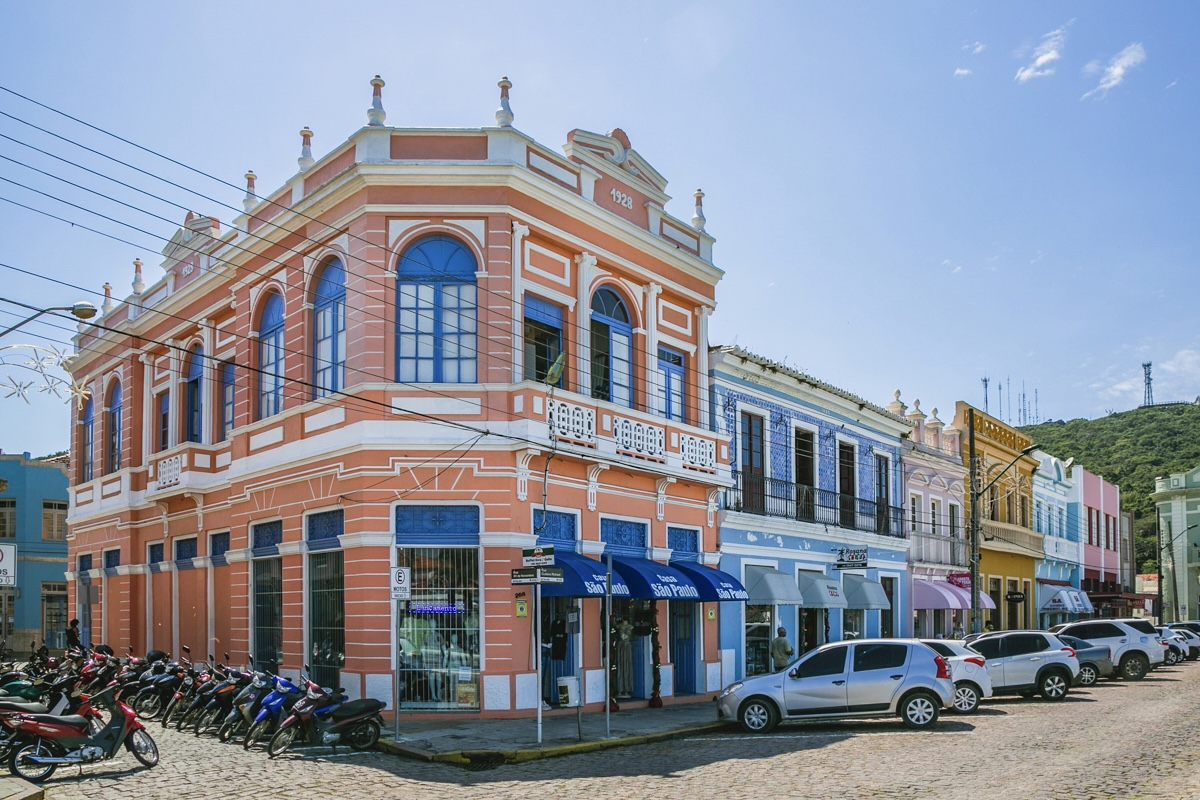
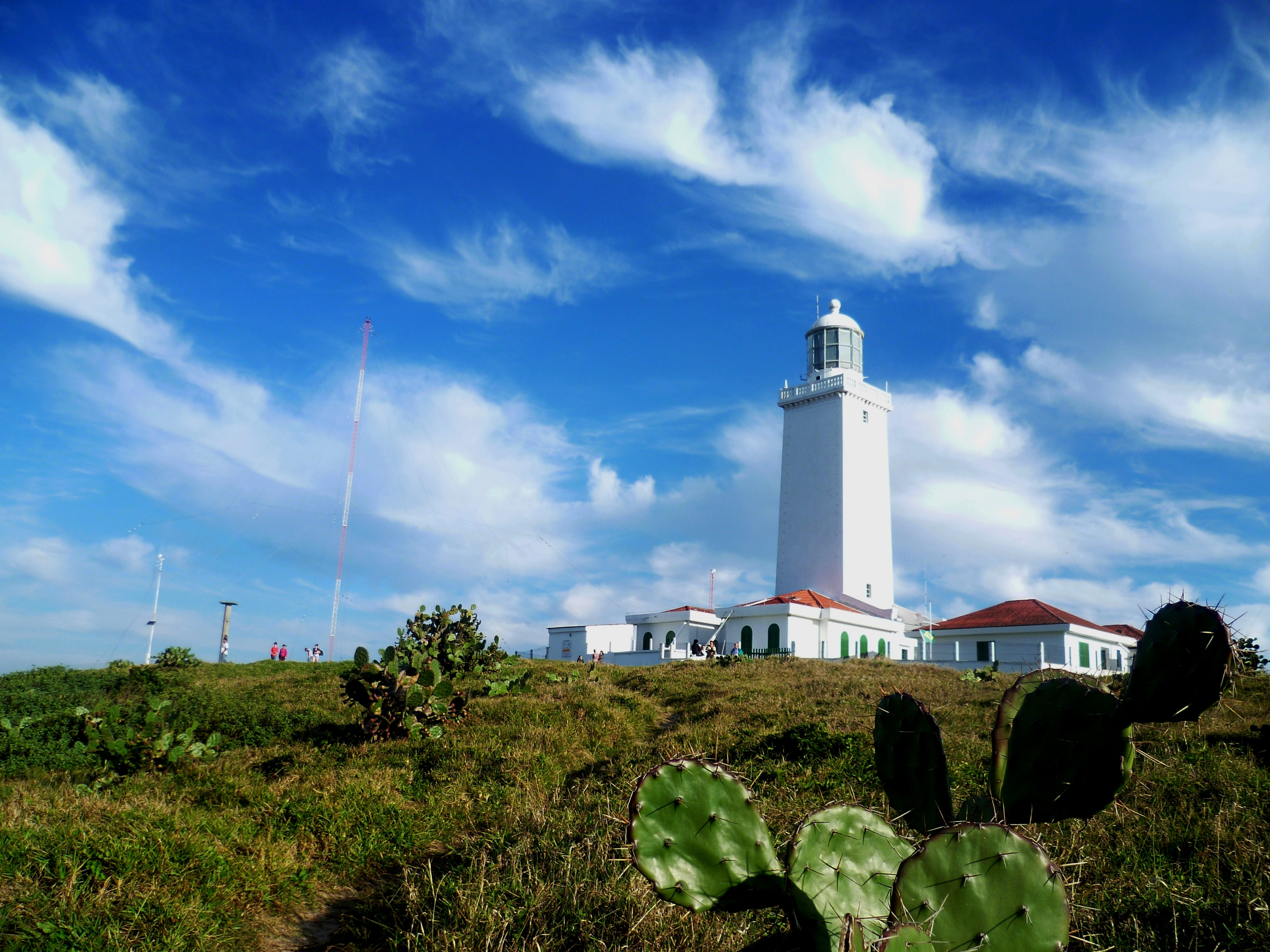
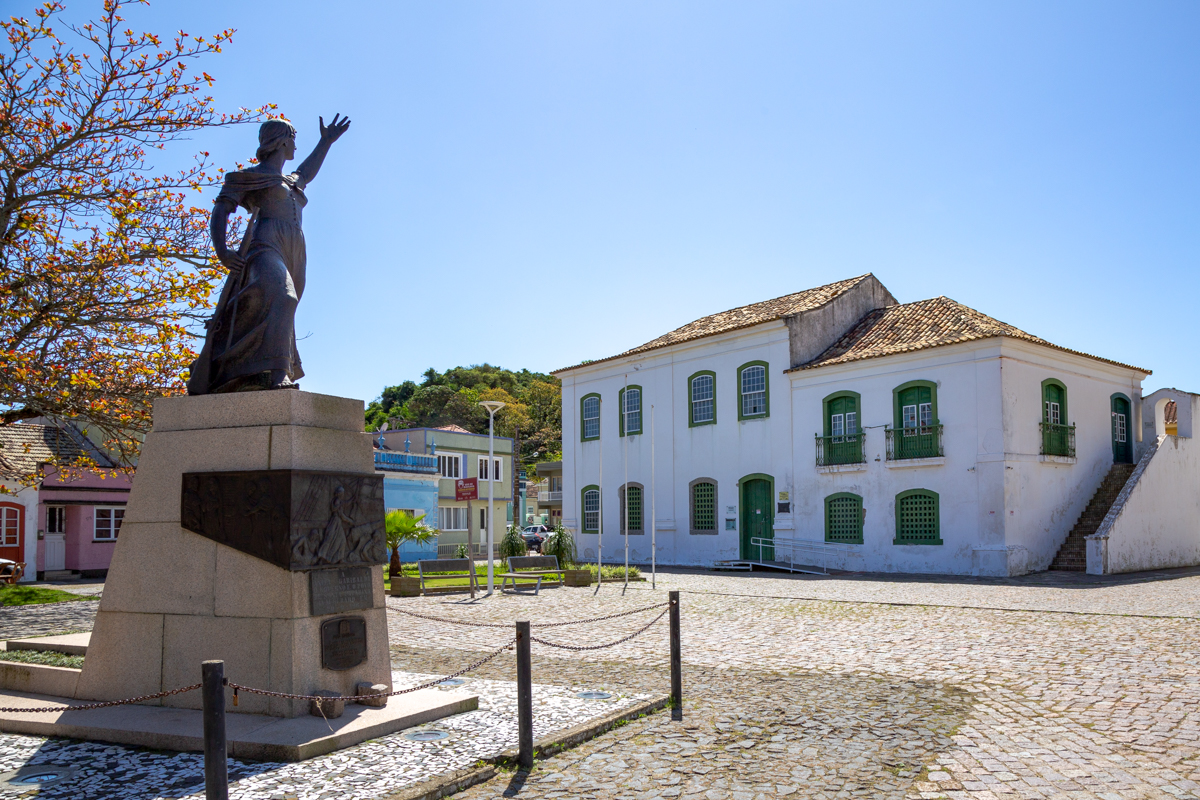
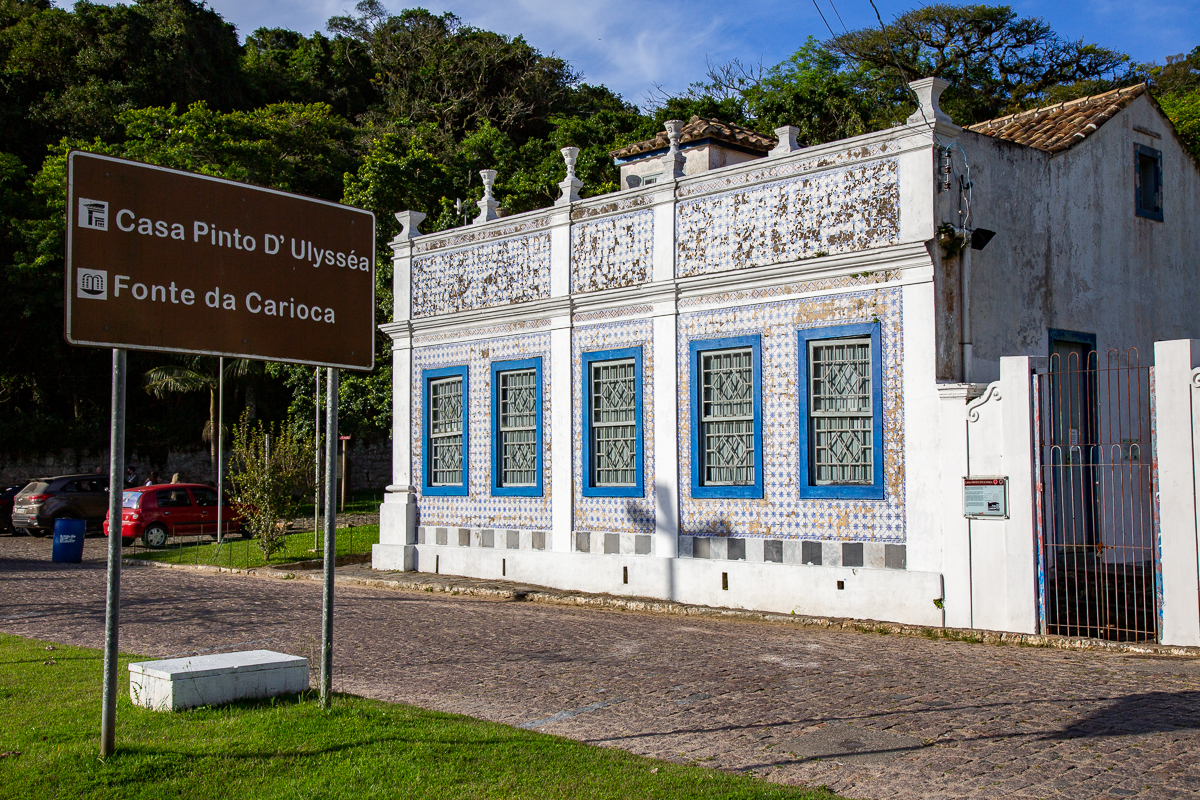
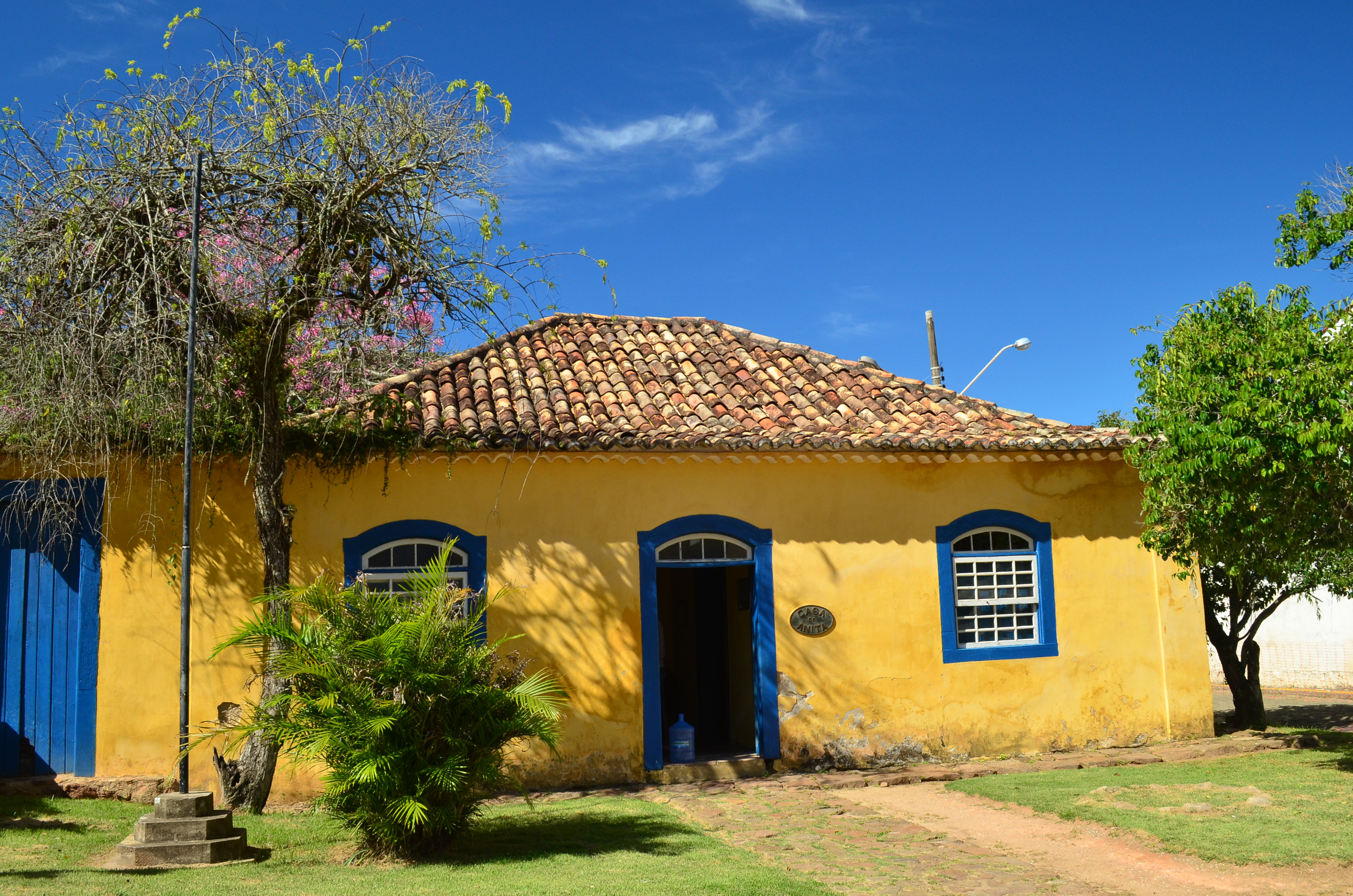
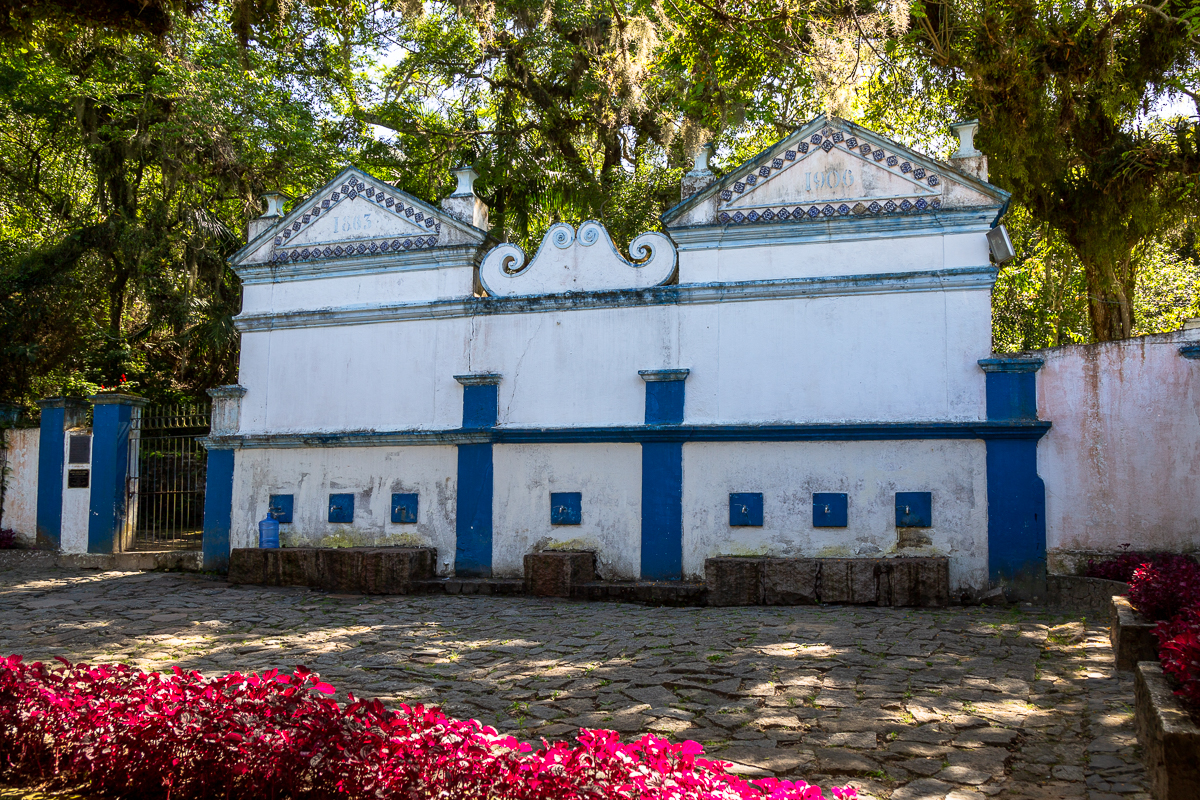
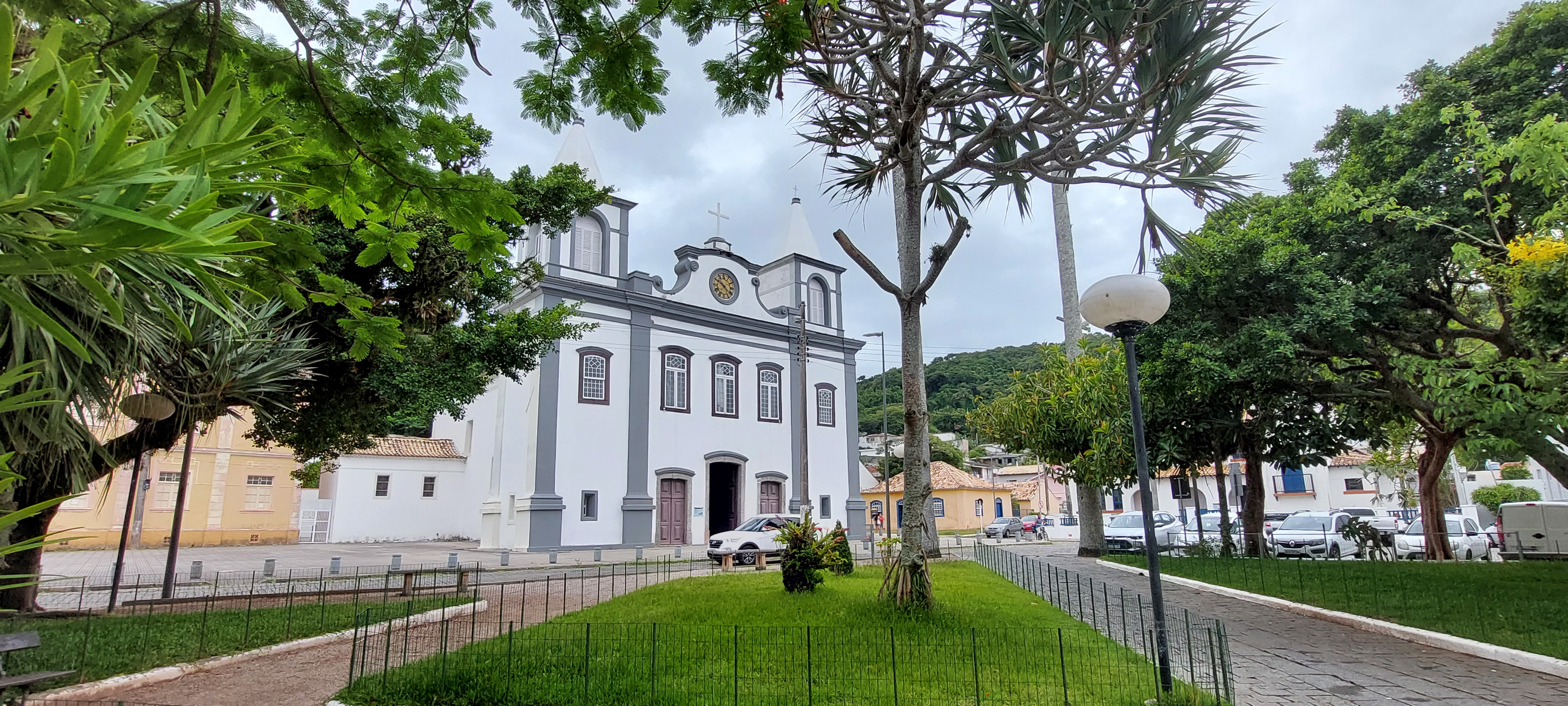

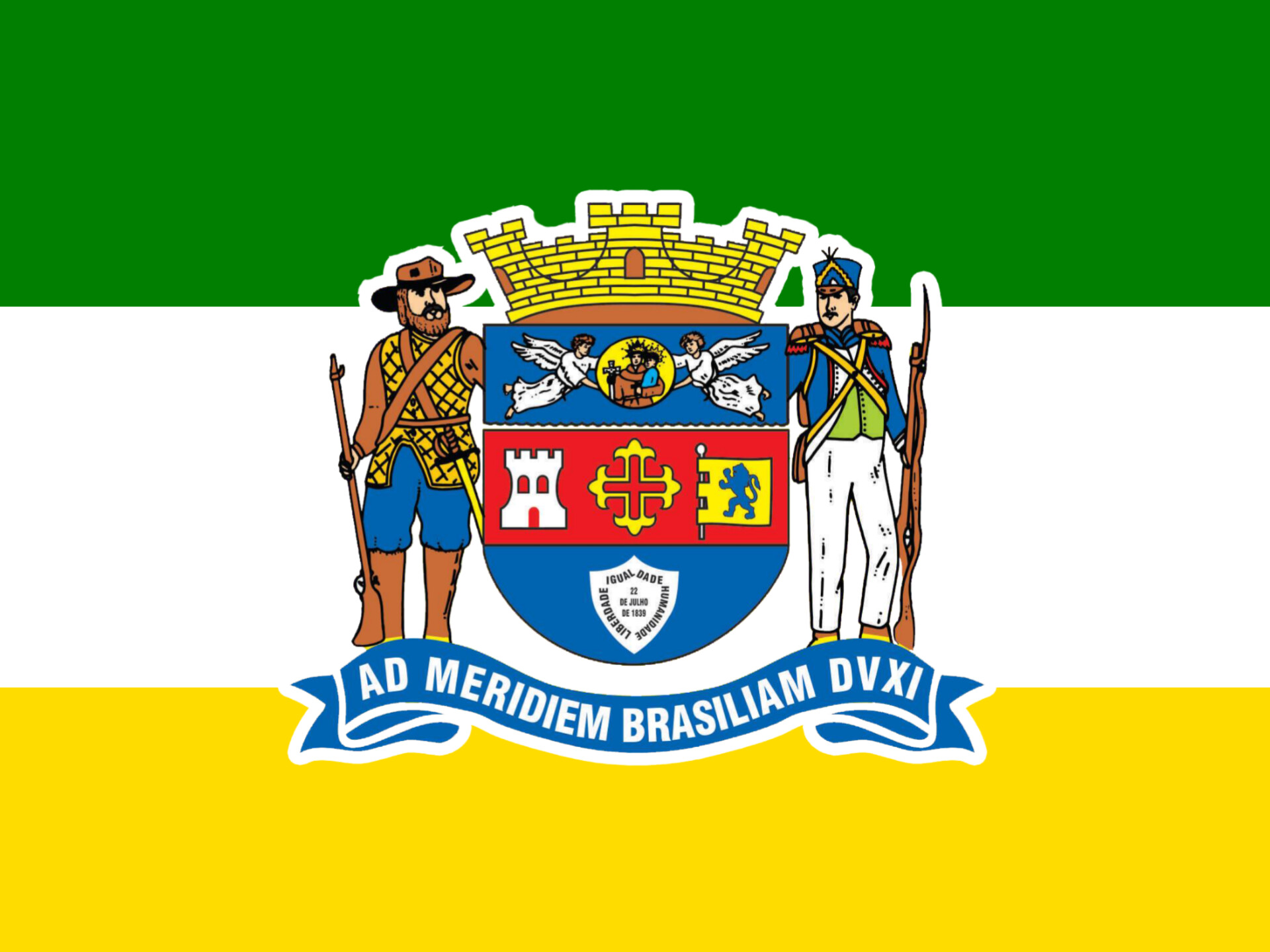
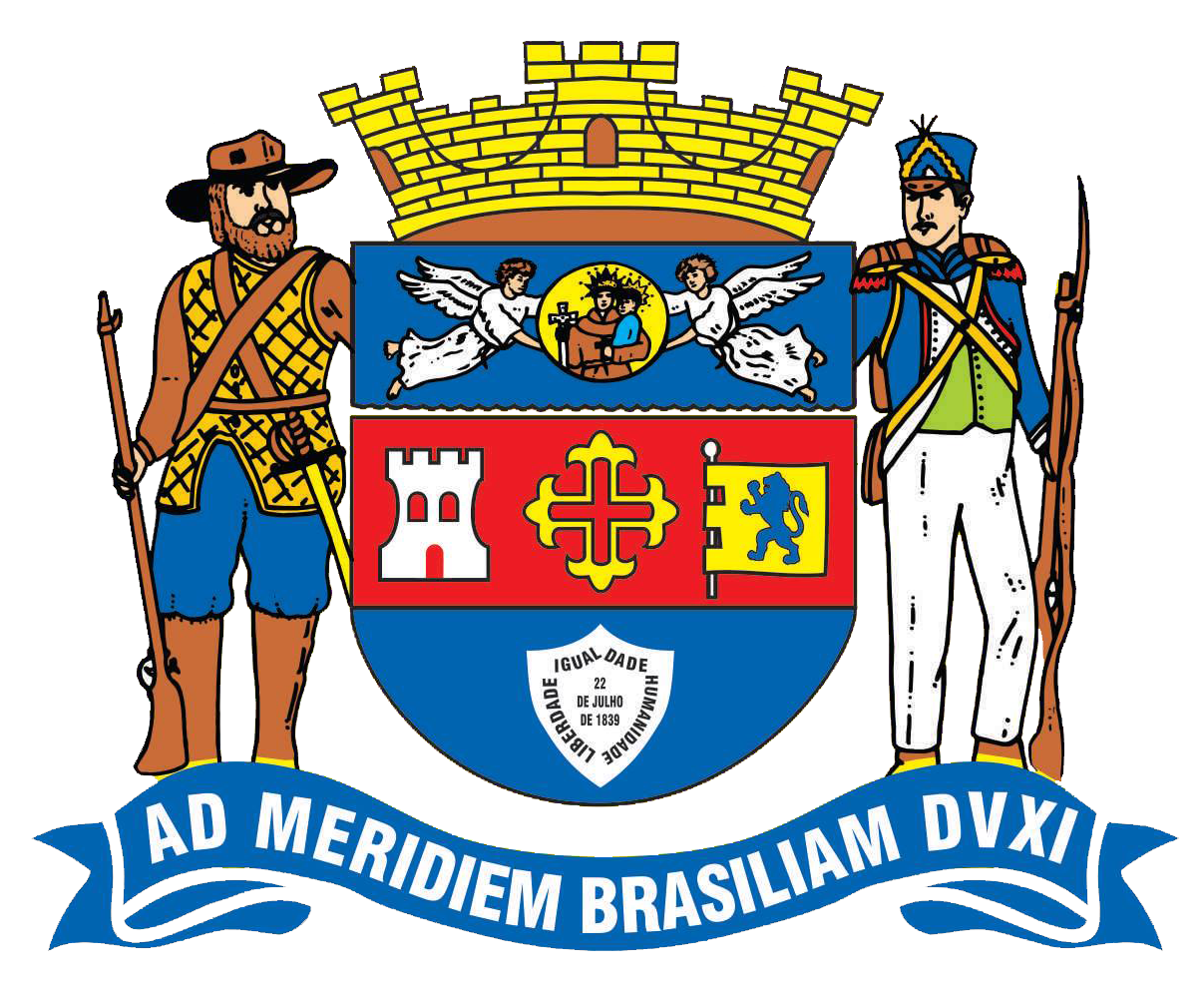
- Flag Coat of arms

- Location in Santa Catarina state

- Location in Brazil
- Coordinates: 28°28′57″S 48°46′51″W
- Country: Brazil
- Region: South
- State: Santa Catarina

Area
  - Total: 336.40 km^{2} (129.88 sq mi)

Population (2020)
  - Total: 46,122
  - Density: 137.10/km^{2} (355.10/sq mi)
- Time zone: UTC−3 (BRT)
- HDI (2010): 0.752 – high
- Website: www.laguna.sc.gov.br

Laguna is a Brazilian municipality located in the southern state of Santa Catarina, 120 kilometers south of the state's capital, Florianópolis, and north east of Porto Alegre. The population is 46,122 (2020 est.) in an area of 336.4 km^{2}. The elevation is 2 m. The BR-101 coastal highway passes through the municipality.

The city was founded in 1676 by rural people of the capitania of São Vicente. In 1714, the locality was recognized as a municipality, and in 1847 it received the status of city. It was the capital of the short-lived Juliana Republic in 1839. The city's flag is a tricolor with yellow, white and green, and has a coat of arms in the middle.

A pod of bottlenose dolphins resident in the sea off Laguna drive fish towards fishermen who stand at the beach in shallow waters. Then one dolphin rolls over, which the fishermen take as sign to throw out their nets. The dolphins feed on the escaping fish. The dolphins were not trained for this behavior; the collaboration has been going on at least since 1847. Southern right whales also can be seen from shores during winter to spring seasons.

== People ==
- Anita Garibaldi, wife of Italian revolutionary Giuseppe Garibaldi

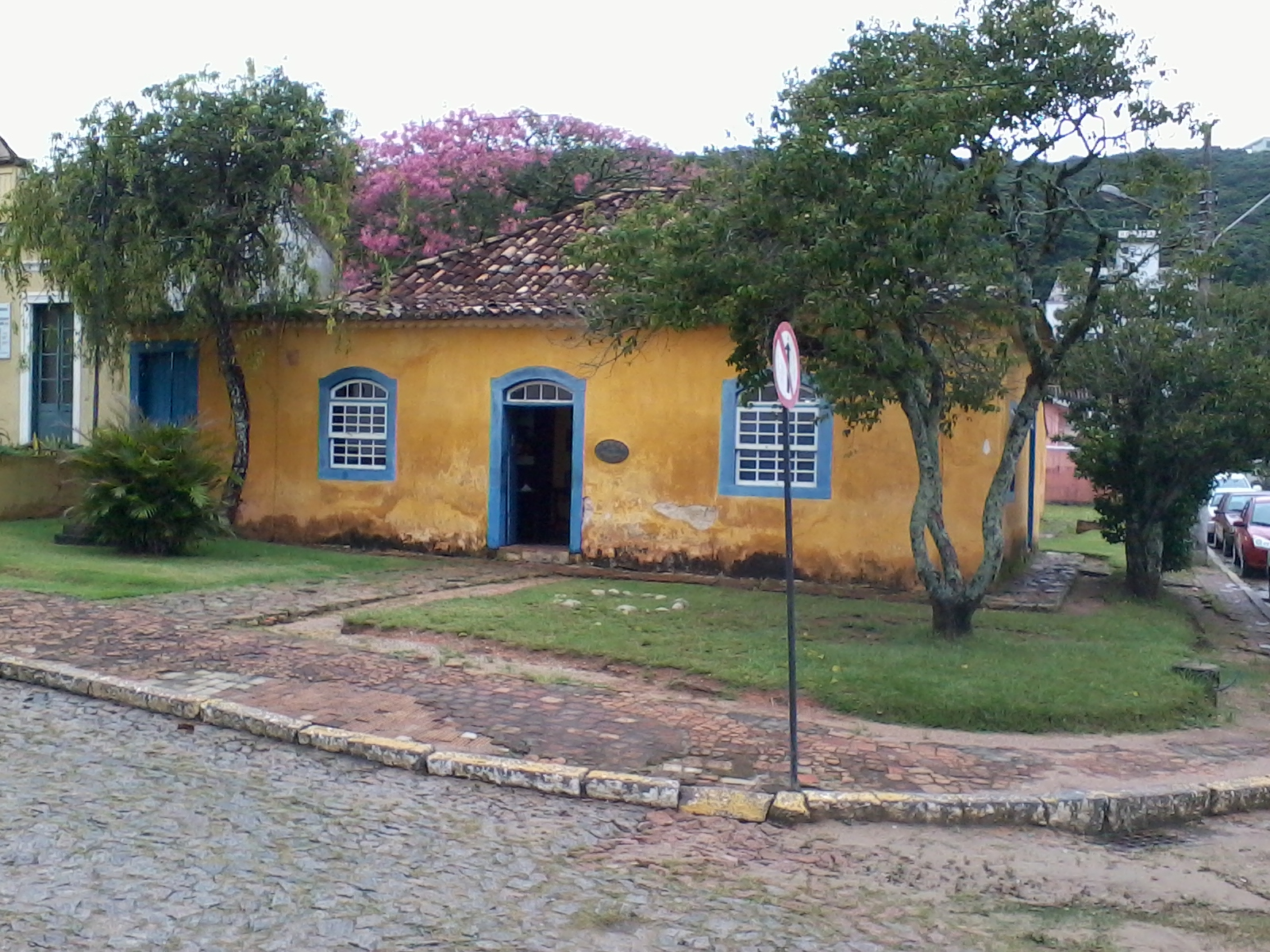
House of Anita Garibaldi in Laguna, Santa Catarina, southern Brazil

== Climate ==
Climate data for Laguna (1976–2005)
Month	Jan	Feb	Mar	Apr	May	Jun	Jul	Aug	Sep	Oct	Nov	Dec	Year
Record high °C (°F)	36.9 (98.4)	37.3 (99.1)	36.3 (97.3)	33.4 (92.1)	37.1 (98.8)	31.3 (88.3)	34.7 (94.5)	35.7 (96.3)	31.1 (88.0)	35.1 (95.2)	33.2 (91.8)	36.3 (97.3)	37.3 (99.1)
Mean daily maximum °C (°F)	27.4 (81.3)	27.5 (81.5)	26.5 (79.7)	24.3 (75.7)	22.0 (71.6)	20.0 (68.0)	19.4 (66.9)	19.3 (66.7)	20.2 (68.4)	21.8 (71.2)	23.7 (74.7)	25.7 (78.3)	23.2 (73.7)
Daily mean °C (°F)	23.7 (74.7)	23.9 (75.0)	23.1 (73.6)	20.9 (69.6)	18.4 (65.1)	16.5 (61.7)	15.7 (60.3)	16.2 (61.2)	17.0 (62.6)	18.6 (65.5)	20.4 (68.7)	22.2 (72.0)	19.7 (67.5)
Mean daily minimum °C (°F)	20.6 (69.1)	20.9 (69.6)	20.1 (68.2)	17.7 (63.9)	15.3 (59.5)	13.4 (56.1)	12.6 (54.7)	13.2 (55.8)	14.3 (57.7)	15.9 (60.6)	17.5 (63.5)	19.1 (66.4)	16.7 (62.1)
Record low °C (°F)	13.0 (55.4)	13.0 (55.4)	10.6 (51.1)	8.8 (47.8)	4.0 (39.2)	3.0 (37.4)	2.0 (35.6)	0.0 (32.0)	5.6 (42.1)	8.4 (47.1)	9.2 (48.6)	11.8 (53.2)	0.0 (32.0)
Average precipitation mm (inches)	107.5 (4.23)	109.0 (4.29)	140.7 (5.54)	96.1 (3.78)	107.3 (4.22)	104.7 (4.12)	101.5 (4.00)	129.3 (5.09)	144.7 (5.70)	119.9 (4.72)	122.5 (4.82)	90.1 (3.55)	1,373.3 (54.06)
Average relative humidity (%)	81	82	82	81	82	83	83	83	85	83	81	80	82
Mean monthly sunshine hours	208	172	193	179	181	156	174	166	144	168	200	221	2,162
Source: Empresa Brasileira de Pesquisa Agropecuária (EMBRAPA)

== See also ==
- Capture of Laguna
- Recapture of Laguna
