= Ragamuffin War =

1835–45 Republican uprising in southern Brazil

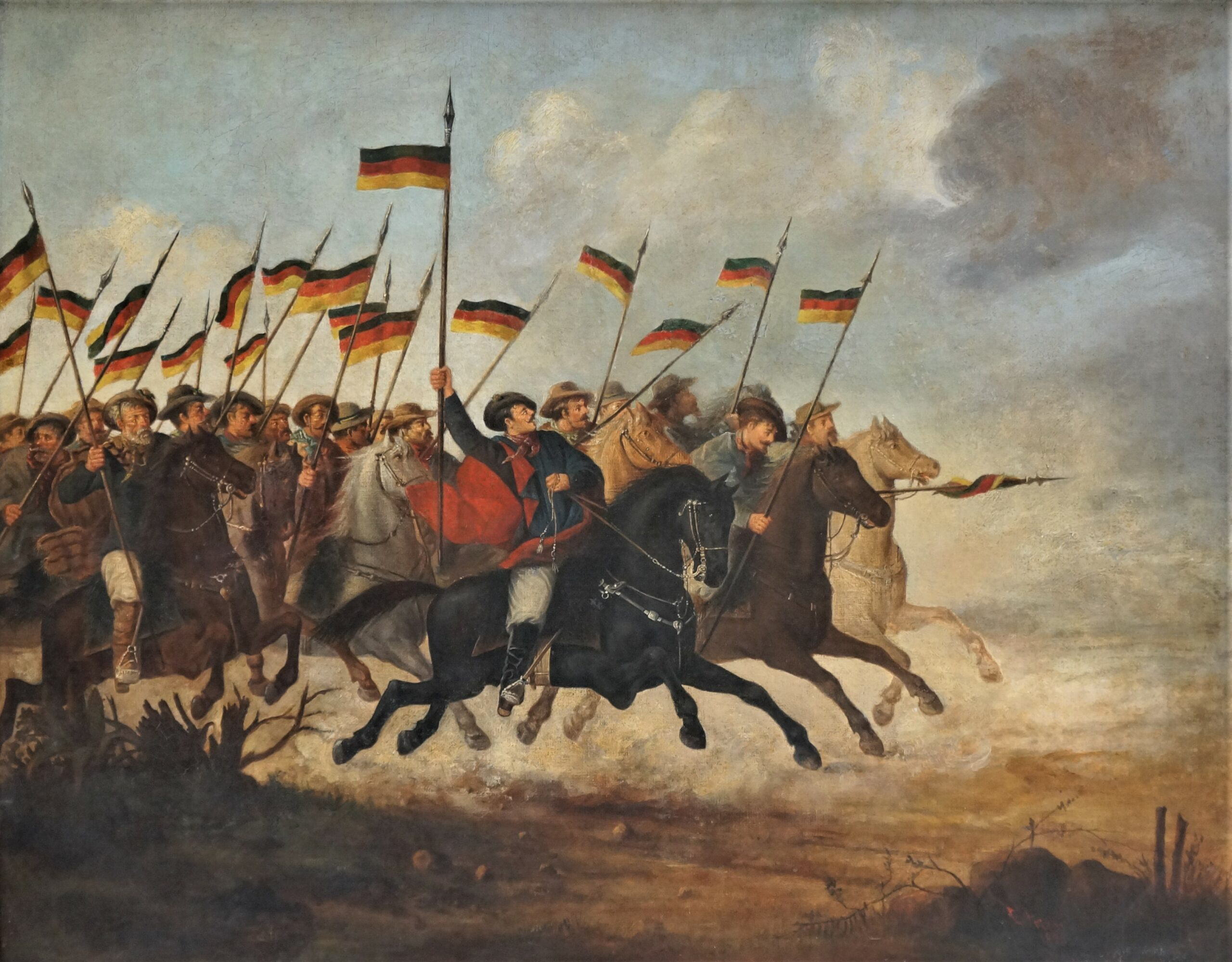
- Charge of the Cavalry by Guilherme Litran depicting the Riograndense army.
| Date | 20 September 1835 – 1 March 1845 (9 years, 5 months, 1 week and 2 days) |
| Location | Rio Grande do Sul and Santa Catarina |
| Result | Imperial victory |
| Territorial changes | The Juliana Republic and the Riograndense Republic are dissolved and reintegrated into the Empire. |

Belligerents
| Piratini Republic; Juliana Republic; Supported by: Colorados; Unitarians | Empire of Brazil |

Commanders and leaders
| Bento Gonçalves; Lima e Silva X; Sousa Neto; Giuseppe Garibaldi; Vicente da Fontoura; David Canabarro | Pedro II; Baron of Caxias; Manuel Rodrigues; Manuel M. de Sousa; Sebastião Barreto; John Pascoe Grenfell |

Strength
| 10,000 soldiers | 20,000 soldiers |

Casualties and losses
- 3,000 killed

The Ragamuffin War (Portuguese: Guerra dos Farrapos), also known as the Ragamuffin Revolution or Heroic Decade, (Note: Portuguese: Revolução Farroupilha, Decênio Heroico.) was a republican uprising that began in southern Brazil during the regency period, centered in the province of Rio Grande do Sul and, for a time, extending into Santa Catarina. It began on 20 September 1835, when rebel forces seized Porto Alegre, and soon turned into a wider confrontation between Brazil's imperial government and a coalition led by Bento Gonçalves and Antônio de Sousa Neto, who proclaimed the secession of the province and the creation of the Riograndense Republic following the rebel victory at the battle of Seival in 1836.

The war is often situated within the political and institutional instability of Brazil's regency period, when several armed conflicts erupted across the country, exposing the fragility of the imperial authority amid disputes between the Central government and Brazil's provinces over the latter's degree of autonomy. In Rio Grande do Sul, whose economy relied on livestock and the production of jerked beef for the internal market, the immediate cause for revolt lay with the landowners dissatisfaction with high export taxes and import duties on salt imposed by the Imperial government, while Uruguay and Argentina benefited from more favorable taxation in Brazilian markets, thus making the local produce less competitive within the country, but it is also attributed to a desire for greater autonomy and opposition to the government's centralized control over the province.

Once proclaimed, the new republic operated from shifting inland capitals such as Piratini, as Porto Alegre remained in Imperial control for the remainder of the conflict after being recaptured in 1836. From the late 1830s onward, the war also became entangled with the politics of the wider Río de la Plata region, as the rebels pursued agreements and alliances with neighboring Argentine and Uruguayan caudillos, notably Fructuoso Rivera. In 1839, with the participation of the Italian revolutionary Giuseppe Garibaldi, the republicans took the war to the Brazilian coast and proclaimed the short-lived Juliana Republic in Santa Catarina following the capture of Laguna. The revolution also influenced other rebel movements in the country, such as the Sabinada, in Bahia, in 1837, and the Liberal Rebellions in Minas Gerais and São Paulo, in 1842. It ended on 1 March 1845 with the Treaty of Ponche Verde, which granted amnesty and reintegration terms for the rebel leaders into the Imperial Army.

Some rebel leaders promised freedom to those enslaved men who enlisted into the Republican army and as a result many slaves organized their own troops during the conflict, including the Black Lancers, who were annihilated in a surprise attack in 1844 known as the Porongos Massacre. Due to this fact, the historian Clóvis Moura interpreted the Ragamuffin movement as abolitionist, but other historians argue he was mistaken. The rebels as a whole never demanded the general abolition of slavery, and the 1843 republican constitution preserved slavery; while most rebel commanders, including Bento Gonçalves, were themselves slaveholders.

== Etymology ==
In Portuguese, the term farrapo literally denotes a rag or torn piece of cloth, and by extension can refer to someone shabbily dressed (a "ragamuffin"). In turn, the derivation farroupilha, a derogatory label used to refer to the rebels, circulated earlier in the political vocabulary during Brazil's regency period, especially in the Court (Rio de Janeiro), where it was used as a nickname for the political faction associated with the radical wing of liberalism (the "exalted liberals", also called jurujubas). This milieu produced and consumed a dense newspaper and pamphlet press in which factional labels were deployed as weapons and badges of identity. In that context, farroupilha operated as a marker of those who defended strong provincial autonomy, federalism, and were hostile to centralizing projects. While farroupilha is well-attested as a regency-era factional nickname in the Court, contemporaneous narratives about Rio Grande do Sul's provincial politics describe farrapos and farroupilhas as paired epithets in local partisan conflict. Lindolfo Collor stated that "legalists" (reactionaries) called the province's liberals farrapos or farroupilhas to imply they had "no representation in society", adding that the liberals, rather than taking offense, came to embrace the label with pride.

== History ==
=== Beginning of the war ===
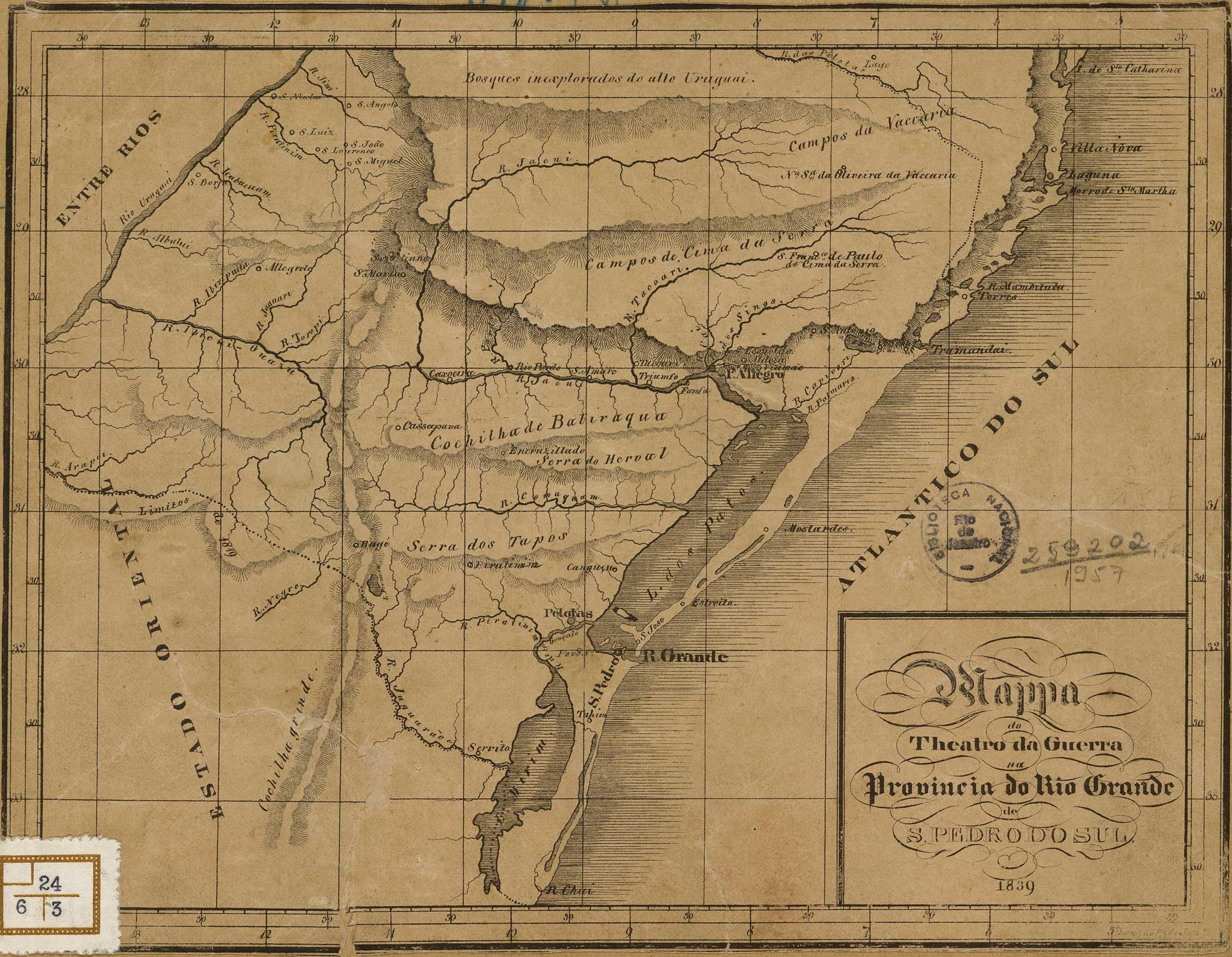
Theater of war map in 1839

The uprising is believed to have begun over the difference between the economy of Rio Grande do Sul and that of the rest of the country. Unlike the other provinces, the economy of Rio Grande do Sul focused on the internal market rather than exporting commodities. The province's main product, charque (dried and salted beef), suffered badly from competition from charque imported from Uruguay and Argentina. The people that benefited from these markets were called Gaúchos: nomadic cowhands and farmers who lived in Rio Grande do Sul. The Gaúchos also lived in Argentina and Uruguay.

In 1835, Antônio Rodrigues Fernandes Braga was nominated president of Rio Grande do Sul. At first, his appointment pleased the liberal farmers, but that soon changed. On his first day in the office, he accused many farmers of being separatists.

On 20 September 1835, General Bento Gonçalves captured the capital, Porto Alegre, beginning an uprising against the perceived unfair trade reinforced by the provincial government. The provincial president fled to the city of Rio Grande, 334 km (208 mi) to the south. In Porto Alegre, the rebels, also known as "ragamuffins" (Portuguese: farrapos) after the fringed leather worn by the gaúchos, elected Marciano José Pereira Ribeiro their new president. Responding to the situation and further upsetting the rebels, the Brazilian regent, Diogo Antônio Feijó, appointed a new provincial president, who was forced to take office in exile in Rio Grande.

The Brazilian Army had a number of problems at the time and was not able to handle the secessionist threat. Through military reforms, the mass recruitment of civilians was made possible and they were able to quell the rebels in 1845.

=== Declaration of independence ===
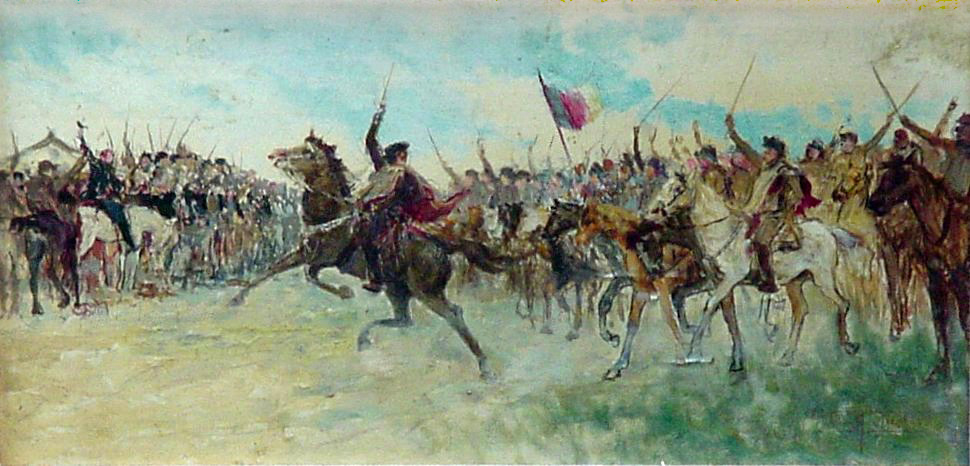
Declaration of the Piratini Republic.

Pushing to consolidate their power, Antônio de Souza Neto declared the independence of the Riograndense, or the Republic of Piratini, on 11 September 1836, with Bento Gonçalves as president nominee. However, Gonçalves was arrested and jailed by imperial forces until he escaped in 1837, returning to the province and bringing the revolution to a head. Nonetheless, Porto Alegre had been recaptured by the empire in June 1836, and the rebels never managed to retake it.

Led by the Italian revolutionary Giuseppe Garibaldi, who joined the rebels in 1836, and his wife, Anita Garibaldi, the revolution spread north through Santa Catarina, which adjoined Rio Grande do Sul. Without an appropriate port for their newborn republican navy, the revolutionaires aimed for one of the main cities of Santa Catarina, Laguna, which was taken by the rebels but fell back into imperial hands after four months. It was in this struggle that Garibaldi gained his first military experience and got on the road leading to his becoming the famed military leader of the Unification of Italy. The rebel forces were also aided financially and indirect military support by the Uruguayan government led by José Fructuoso Rivera. The Uruguayans had the intention of creating a political union with the Riograndense Republic to create a new stronger state.

=== Resultant peace ===
The rebels refused an offer of amnesty in 1840. In 1842, they issued a Republican constitution as a last attempt to maintain power. The same year saw General Lima e Silva take command of Imperial forces in the area and try to negotiate a settlement.

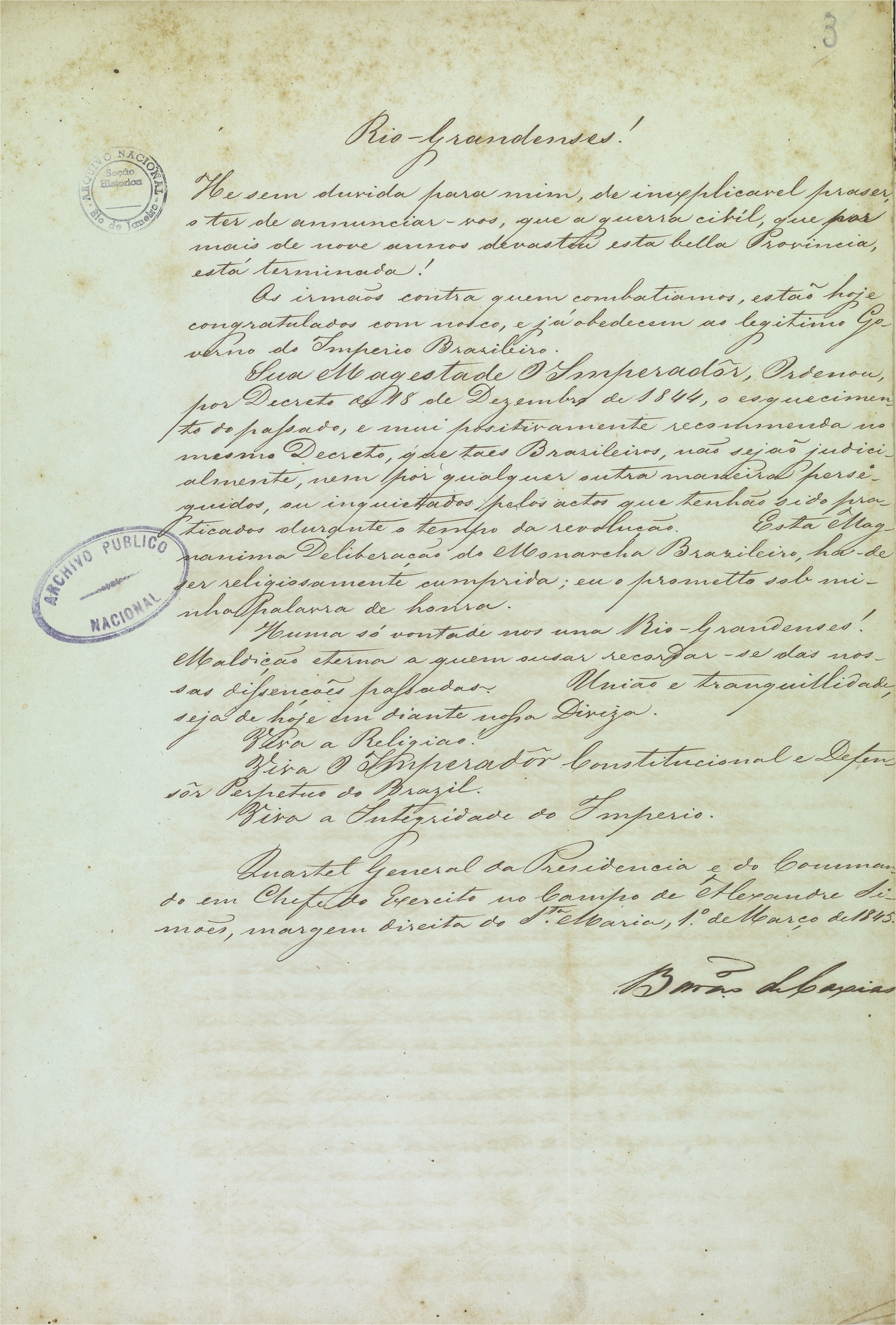
Declaration of the Brazilian Government announcing the end of the war, in 1845

On 1 March 1845, the peace negotiations led by Lima e Silva and Antônio Vicente da Fontoura concluded with the signing of the Green Poncho Treaty (Portuguese: Tratado de Poncho Verde) between the two sides, in Dom Pedrito. The treaty offered the rebels a full amnesty, full incorporation into the imperial army and the choice of the next provincial president. All the debts of the Riograndense Republic were paid off by the Empire and a tariff of 25% was introduced on imported charque. The Riograndense and Juliana Republics remained in the Empire of Brazil and are now two states of the Federative Republic of Brazil, Rio Grande do Sul and Santa Catarina respectively.

As a goodwill gesture, the rebels chose Lima e Silva as the next provincial president.

== Participants ==
=== Ragamuffins ===
All of those who revolted against the imperial government were called Ragamuffins (Portuguese: Farrapos).

In 1832, the Ragamuffin Party was founded by Lieutenant Luís José dos Reis Alpoim, deported from Rio de Janeiro to Porto Alegre. The group used to meet at Major João Manuel de Lima e Silva's house. Lima e Silva's home also worked as the headquarters of Sociedade Continentino, the editor of the newspaper called O Continentino, which strongly criticized the Empire.

On 24 October 1833, the Ragamuffins promoted an uprising against the installation of the Military Society in Porto Alegre.

Southern Freemasonry, tending to republican ideals, had an essential role in the directions taken, and many of the Ragamuffin leaders were its adherents, among them, Bento Gonçalves da Silva, with the codename Sucre. Bento organized other Masonic lodges in the territory of Rio Grande do Sul, which he had been allowed to do since 1833.

=== Empire ===
Their imperial troops were called, by the ragamuffins, caramurus or camels, a jocular term generally applied to members of the Restoration Party in the Imperial Parliament.

== Minorities in the war ==
=== Indigenous ===
In the years before the Ragamuffin War, the indigenous people were seen as a subdivision of the free population and performed the same jobs as white and free men: livestock and war activities. The most famous village is called São Nicolau and is located in Rio Pardo, consisting of indigenous people from the eastern reductions.

Like the blacks, the indigenous people actively participated in the Ragamuffin War from the first to the last day. Although the indigenous presence in the conflict is scarce in the historiography of the Ragamuffin War, through the analysis of letters exchanged between the military, the strategic battle plans, and reports, it is possible to verify that the presence of this group was fundamental for the war.

Another historical evidence that indirectly points to the presence of Indians in the war is the population change in indigenous villages during the war period. In the village of Capela de Santa Maria, there was a sharp drop during the war. The same happened with the village of São Nicolau, which also witnessed a demographic change with the predominance of older people and children in the village as men in adulthood went to war. The villages of São Vicente and Santa Isabel lasted less than three years due to the effects of the war.

However, the fact that the indigenous people participated in the war does not mean that they supported the cause, whether Ragamuffin or imperial, in its entirety. Several indigenous people were arrested after deserting their posts in the army or arguing with the leaders of the troops. Among the motivations for enlistment, the possibility of obtaining uniforms and weapons stands out; since, in cases of desertion, the indigenous people took the clothes and weapons they had received with them.

==== In Ragamuffin troops ====
Although indigenous people fought on both sides, their presence in the Ragamuffin troops is more documented than in the imperial forces.

Both in the campaign and the areas under the administration of the Ragamuffin rebels, there was difficulty in recruiting people to fight in the war, and one solution to increase the military contingent was to resort to the voluntary engagement of indigenous people. They performed different tasks, among which we can highlight the training of horses and fighting on the battlefield, and many did them without receiving any remuneration.

Indigenous participation in the Ragamuffin troops was heterogeneous. As mentioned before, some indigenous individuals were arrested for disobedience to the orders of their superiors, which indicates that they probably did not occupy a prestigious space within the military hierarchy. However, some indigenous people held high positions and even leadership positions, such as Roque Faustino, a captain in the Ragamuffin army and executed as a prisoner of war.

==== In historiography ====
Despite the immense amount of bibliography on the Ragamuffin War, there is still a lack of works that report the presence of indigenous people in the conflict. These remain obscured to this day in the historiographical production of the Ragamuffin War, even though, in official documents, their presence, both on the imperial side and the farrago side has never been hidden.

A research done at the UFRGS Central Library collection found only eight books that mentioned the indigenous presence in the Ragamuffin War among more than 50 works. Among the eight works, four talked about the murder of the Ragamuffin leader João Manoel de Lima e Silva by the indigenous captain Roque Faustino in 1837 (História da República Rio-Grandense: 1834–1845, by Dante de Laytano (1936); O Sentido e o Espírito da Revolução Farroupilha, by J. P. Coelho de Souza (1945); Memória da Guerra dos Farrapos, by Francisco de Sá Brito; and História Geral do Rio Grande do Sul: 1503–1957, by Artur Ferreira Filho (1958)). while the authors remember Lima e Silva as "noble" and "brave", Roque Faustino is characterized as "immoral" and "dishonest".

Three other works (A Epopéia Farroupilha: pequena história da Grande Revolução, acompanhada de farta documentação da época: 1835–1845, by Spalding (1963); A Revolução Farroupilha (1835–1845) – Narrativa Sintética das Operações Militares by Augusto Tasso Fragoso) comment on the indigenous presence in the troops of General Bento Manoel Ribeiro. Among these books, the one that has a more comprehensive commentary is Fragoso's, where, in his description of the victory of Bento Manoel's loyalist troops in the combat of Passo do Rosário, he emphasizes the existence of infantry composed of 80 Guaraní and, lists in a footnote, that in Bento Manoel's forces during the Battle of Fanfa, an infantry unit, and a lancer unit was coming from the missions and, therefore, presenting a high probability of being composed of Guaranís.

It is possible that even in the early 19th century, the indigenous population was almost nonexistent in the region, as a result of ethnic cleansing taken into effect against Charruas, Guenoas, and Minuanos on orders from Montevideo and the earlier Spanish rule on previous decades. Guaranies were almost extinct after the taking of Misiones Orientales by the Portuguese in 1801, when many fled to the other side of the Uruguay River.

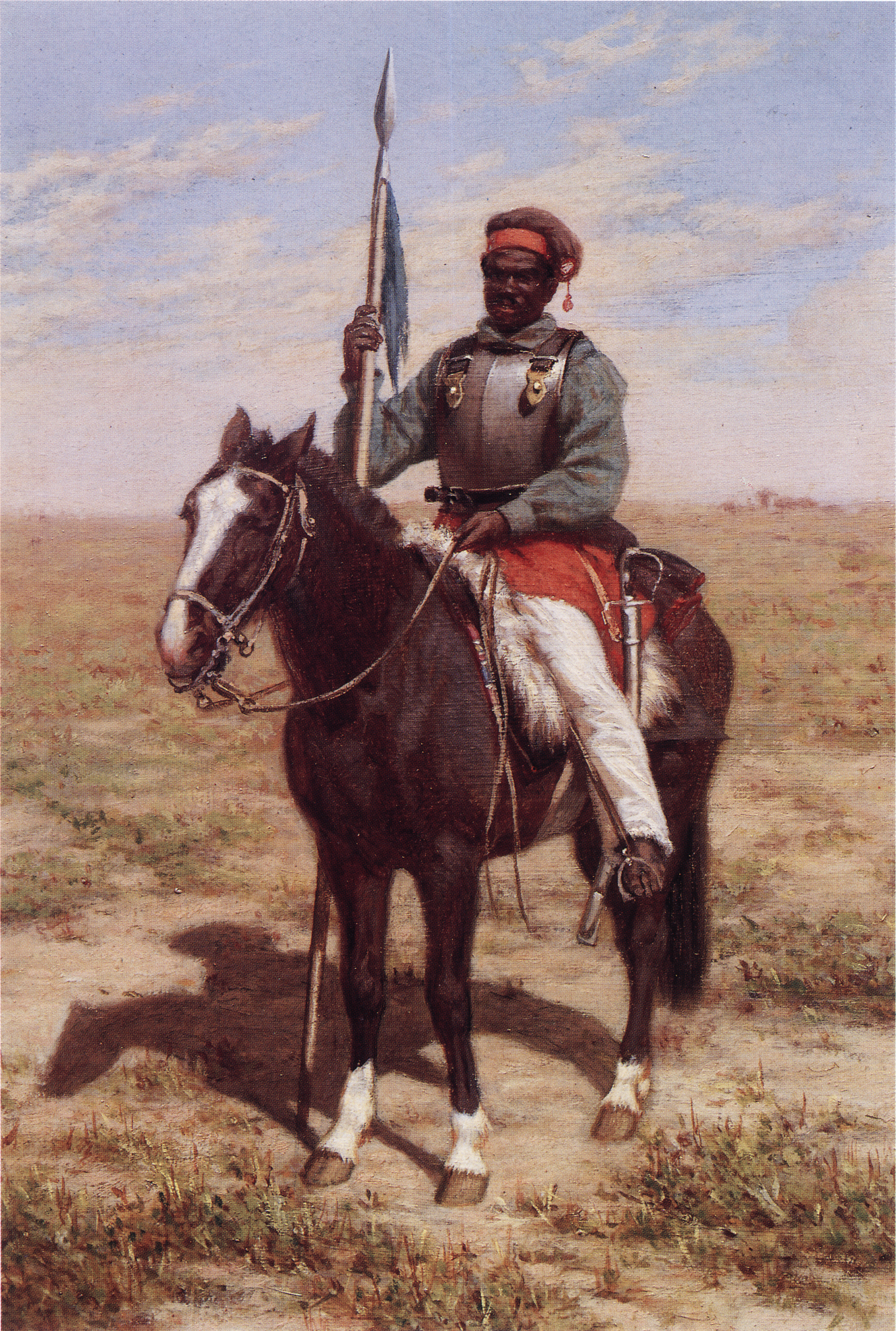
A painting of the "Lanceiros Negros" ("Black Lancers"), a formation of former and freed slaves which served the Riograndense Republic as lancers

=== Afro-Brazilian ===
Afro-Brazilian people during the Ragamuffin War were fundamental and had an active participation throughout the entire conflict. It is estimated that in all, they would represent one third to one half of the republican army. Later, they were integrated into the ragtag groups in the cavalry or infantry. The first was created on 12 September 1836 and the second on 31 August 1838. On 31 August 1838, 426 combatants joined the army.

They were recruited from among peasant slaves and tamers from Serra dos Tapes and Serra do Herval, located between the municipalities of Canguçu, Piratini, Caçapava, Encruzilhada and Arroio Grande, with the promise of liberation after the victory of the Ragamuffins. At first, they were commanded by Lieutenant Colonel Joaquim Pedro Soares, later they were led by Major Joaquim Teixeira Nunes.

Afro-Brazilians played a prominent role in national confrontations, such as the capture of Porto Alegre in 1835 and of Pelotas in April 1836. The groups were composed of Afro-Brazilians and freed slaves, indigenous, mestizos and escaped slaves from other countries, mainly Uruguay. In addition to being soldiers and great defenders of the rags, the Afro-Brazilians also worked as drovers, messengers, campeiros and helped in the manufacture of gunpowder and in the cultivation of tobacco and yerba mate, appreciated by the group.

== Legacy ==
The Brazilian Army reorganized itself to be a proper fighting force during the Ragamuffin War. The military defeated insurgencies that rose up during the Imperial Era of Brazil. However, this reformed military would prove disastrous against the Emperor when they rebelled to create a Republic.

== See also ==
- History of Rio Grande do Sul
- List of wars involving Brazil
- Revolutions of Brazil
