= Second siege of Porto Alegre =

1837 battle of the Ragamuffin War

- Part of the Ragamuffin War
Date	11 May 1837 – 13 February 1838
Location	Porto Alegre, Rio Grande do Sul, Empire of Brazil
Result	Imperial victory

Belligerents
Riograndense Republic	Empire of Brazil

Commanders and leaders
Antônio de Sousa Neto; José Mariano de Matos	Francisco X. da Cunha; Elzeário de Miranda e Brito; Manuel Luis Osório

Strength
1,400 men	700 infantrymen 50 cavalrymen 39 guns

Casualties and losses
5 guns	Unknown

The second siege of Porto Alegre was a siege carried out by rebel forces during the Ragamuffin War in southern Brazil between March 1837 and February of 1838. It was the second out of three sieges to Porto Alegre, the capital of Rio Grande do Sul, during the conflict. Porto Alegre had been in Imperial hands ever since June 1836 (when it was recaptured).

After a long recovery period after the rebel defeat at the Battle of Fanfa, their commander Antônio de Sousa Neto marched towards the city with 1,400 men, and over the course of little less than a year assaulted the city several times, eventually being forced to withdraw by the defenders who were gradually reinforced.

== Background ==
Porto Alegre, the capital of Rio Grande do Sul, was an important political and economic center, and its control was vied for both by the Empire of Brazil and the breakaway Riograndense Republic. At the beginning of the Ragamuffin War the city was taken by the rebels, and, less than a year later, restored to the Empire in a mutiny. After that, it had been subjected to a siege by Bento Gonçalves's rebel forces, whose defeat at the Battle of Fanfa had almost ended the rebellion.

Antônio de Sousa Neto's forces, victorious at the Battle of Seival, however, continued active, and after a series of political upheavals in the region, had managed to amass enough strength to seriously threaten Porto Alegre again.

== Siege ==
Upon the arrival of Neto's force of 1,400 men, they demanded the city's surrender, something which went unanswered. After two attempts at assaulting the city, and an Imperial sortie by Manuel Luis Osório's cavalry, both sides settled into a siege. Neto's cannon bombarded the city four times throughout it, causing light losses.

On June 25th, the Republicans once again tried to take the city by storm, but were defeated by a counter-attack by the Imperial cavalry. July through November saw several limited sorties by the Imperials, aided by the mobility granted by their control of the surrounding rivers. Despite said control, food was still limited in the capital, given the small number of ships available.

On February 1838, provincial president Elzeário de Miranda e Brito embarked a significant force downriver, and landed between the besiegers and Porto Alegre. Threatened with envelopment, they lifted the siege.

The city would be once again besieged in June 1838, after the rebel victory at the Battle of Barro Vermelho.
