= Third siege of Porto Alegre =

- Part of the Ragamuffin War
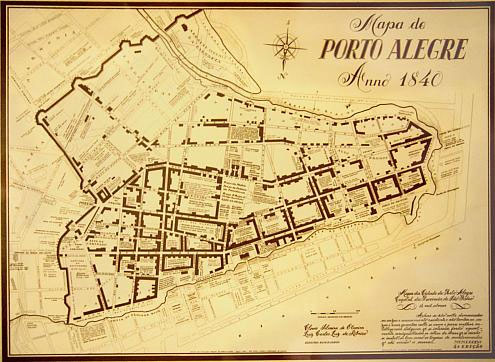
- A map of Porto Alegre in 1840, showing the defensive line around the city
Date	15 June 1838 – 8 December 1840
Location	Porto Alegre, Rio Grande do Sul, Empire of Brazil
Result	Imperial victory

Belligerents
Riograndense Republic	Empire of Brazil

Commanders and leaders
Bento Manuel Ribeiro; David Canabarro; Bento Gonçalves	Elzeário de Miranda e Brito; Pierre Labatut

Strength
Unknown	1,000 men

Casualties and losses
Unknown	Unknown

The third siege of Porto Alegre was a siege carried out by rebel forces during the Ragamuffin War in southern Brazil between June 1838 and December 1840. It was the last siege made to Porto Alegre, the capital of Rio Grande do Sul, during the conflict. Porto Alegre had been in Imperial hands ever since June 1836 (when it was recaptured from the rebels).

After the crucial rebel victory at the Battle of Barro Vermelho, Republican leaders Bento Manuel Ribeiro and David Canabarro marched towards the city with their men; this time, they did not attempt to assault it. Over the course of two and a half years, they kept an important part of the Imperial troops in the province pinned to the city in its defense, before being forced to lift the siege.

== Background ==
Porto Alegre, the capital of Rio Grande do Sul, was an important political and economic center, and its control was vied for both by the Empire of Brazil and the breakaway Riograndense Republic. At the beginning of the Ragamuffin War the city was taken by the rebels, and, less than a year later, restored to the Empire in a mutiny. After that, it was subjected to two sieges by the rebels, one between June and September of 1836, and another between May 1837 and February 1838, both foiled by the arrival of Imperial reinforcements.

The Republican withdrawal from the second siege proved to be short, however, as victory in the Battle of Barro Vermelho granted them the momentum to return to Porto Alegre close to three months later.

== Siege ==
Different from the other two sieges, on this attempt the rebel leaders Bento Manuel Ribeiro and David Canabarro opted not to assault the city directly, being content to keep its sizable garrison busy with its defense. After months of minor skirmishes, Imperial commander Elzeário de Miranda e Brito attempted on January 1839 to break the siege with a maneuver similar to that which he employed on the previous siege, which was to land a sizable amount of troops away from the besiegers to try to envelop them against the city. The rebels maneuvered to envelop him, however, and he retreated to Porto Alegre in February.

In June 1839 Bento Gonçalves took up command of the siege, as Canabarro marched with his men towards Laguna in Santa Catarina, to the north. Close to the end of 1839, Xavier da Cunha, who had participated on both previous sieges ahead of the Imperial defenders, was sent down from São Paulo with a column to reinforce the city. On their way there, however, they were defeated by Republican troops under Teixeira Nunes; Cunha drowned on the Pelotas River during the retreat.

Another column was sent to reinforce the city in December 1840, under Pierre Labatut. Its arrival forced the rebels to lift the siege; in January of that year, they'd already been defeated by Andrade Neves and Francisco Pedro.
