= Battle of Azenha Bridge =

Battle of the Ragamuffin War

- Part of the Ragamuffin War
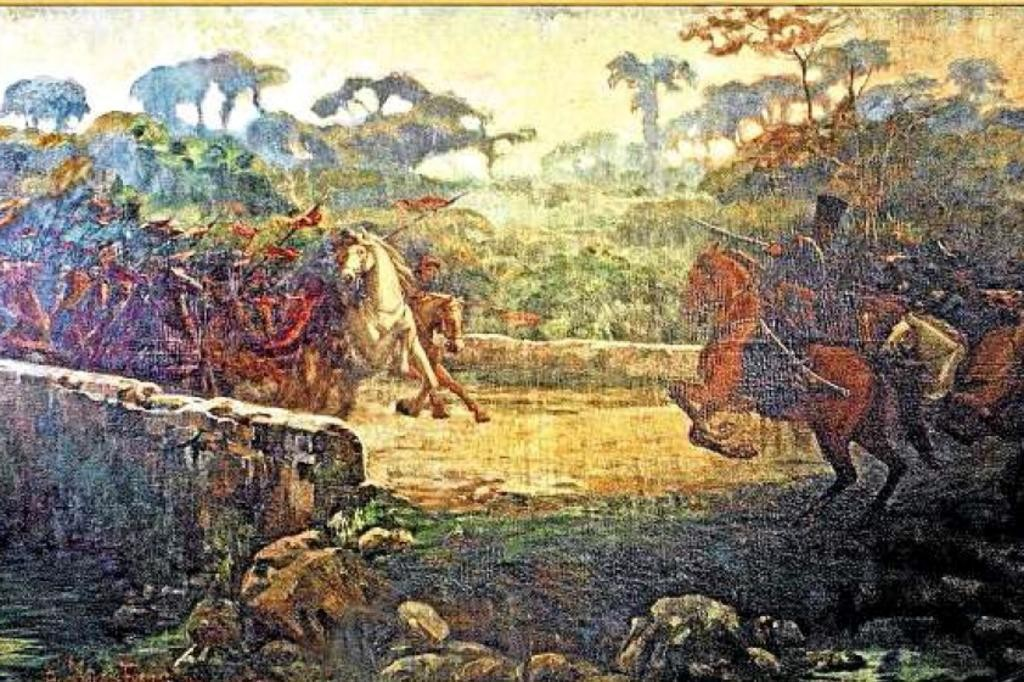
- The capture of the Azenha Bridge, by Augusto Luiz de Freitas
Date	19 September 1835
Location	Porto Alegre, Rio Grande do Sul, Brazil 30°2′51″S 51°12′49″W
Result	Rebel victory

Belligerents
Liberal rebels	Empire of Brazil

Commanders and leaders
Cabo Rocha	José Gordilho (WIA)

Strength
~34	17–20

Casualties and losses
None	7: 2 killed 5 wounded

The Battle of Azenha Bridge (Portuguese: Combate da Ponte da Azenha) was the first battle of the Ragamuffin War, which took place on the night of the 19th to the 20th of September 1835. It gave way to the capture of Porto Alegre by the rebels on the following day.

== Background ==
On the national scale, the Empire of Brazil was facing a period of deep political instability prompted by the minority of emperor Pedro II. The local elites of the Rio Grande do Sul province were not pleased with the regency that took place, as the regency council did not take into account the interests of the local elite when appointing the president of the province. The regents also took centralizing measures in an attempt to curb local autonomy of the provinces nationwide, these measures displeased the more liberal sectors and instigated rebellions across the country.

The economy of Rio Grande do Sul was based on the production of cattle meat and jerky, which were sold to the rest of the country. These products were usually bought by landowners in the more populated provinces up north such as São Paulo and Minas Gerais and used to feed slaves. The elites of these more populated provinces exerted more influence over the regencial government in Rio de Janeiro and, in order to keep prices low, demanded that importing taxes were lifted or lowered from the same goods produced in the neighboring countries such as Argentina and Uruguay. This made the meat and jerky produced in Rio Grande do Sul more expensive than their Argentine and Uruguayan counterparts and was a severe blow to the local economy, which prompted the landowners and local politicians to rebel against the central government.

== Prelude ==
On the night of 18 September 1835, at a meeting attended by José Mariano de Mattos (a separatist politician), Gomes Jardim (cousin of Bento Gonçalves and future president of the Riograndense Republic), Antônio Vicente da Fontoura (an anti-separatist liberal), Pedro Boticário, Paulino da Fontoura (politician and brother of Vicente da Fontoura), Antônio de Sousa Neto (a loyalist at the time, but who already sympathized with republican ideals) and Domingos José de Almeida (a separatist politician and administrator in the future republican government), it was unanimously decided that within two days, on 20 September 1835, they would militarily take Porto Alegre and remove the provincial president Antônio Rodrigues Fernandes Braga.

Militias were alerted to trigger the revolt in several cities in the interior. Bento Gonçalves commanded troops gathered in Pedras Brancas, today the city of Guaíba. Gomes Jardim and colonel Onofre Pires, at the head of 200 horsemen, concentrated in the region of Viamão and headed for the city of Porto Alegre, setting up camp on 19 September 1835 near the Azenha district.

Aware of the rebellion, the president of the province, Antônio Rodrigues Fernandes Braga, ordered the municipal guard, the first-line cavalry picket (about 70 men) and the Company of National Guards on horseback to be armed. As he had little strength in the capital, he appealed to all citizens to assemble, armed, managing to gather a contingent of around 270 men. Brigadier Gaspar Mena Barreto was appointed to coordinate the legal forces, as the Arms Commander, marshal Sebastião Barreto Pereira Pinto, was absent. Three locations considered important were immediately garrisoned: the Government Palace, the Municipal Guard barracks and the War Train (arsenal).

== Battle ==
On the night of the 19th to the 20th of September, the president of the province sent a picket on horseback to recognize the rebel detachment. With a small contingent of 20 men from the National Guard, under the command of major José Egídio Gordilho Barbuda, the second Viscount of Camamu, who had volunteered for the mission. The rebels, however, had already left 30 watchmen next to the Azenha bridge and some 4 others hidden below. Camamu had no combat experience, particularly in night operations, and relied on volunteer troops. At the first warning signal from the rebels, the advanced group, led by Camamu, fired their weapons and quickly retreated, assuming that it was a strong reaction from the rebels, causing a general stampede that led to panic among the troops. The rebel picket, armed with spears, charged against the loyalist troops and pursued them, wounding Camamu, who abandoned his horse, sword and helmet to save his own life.

== Aftermath ==
The next day, the rebels entered the city unopposed. The Permanent Corps immediately joined them, with the exception of the commander, the sub-commander, a corporal, a soldier and a bugler. The president of the province, feeling unprotected, took refuge first in the War Arsenal and then in the schooner Rio-grandense, traveling that same night to the city of Rio Grande.

With almost no struggle, other than small skirmishes, the rebels asserted their absolute control over the capital, also gaining support in the interior of the province. The City Council, convened extraordinarily by Bento Gonçalves on September 21, swore in Marciano José Pereira Ribeiro, who was fourth in the general order of precedence of the vice-presidents of the Province, as the new provincial president.
