= Battle of Fanfa =

Battle of the Ragamuffin War

- Part of the Ragamuffin War
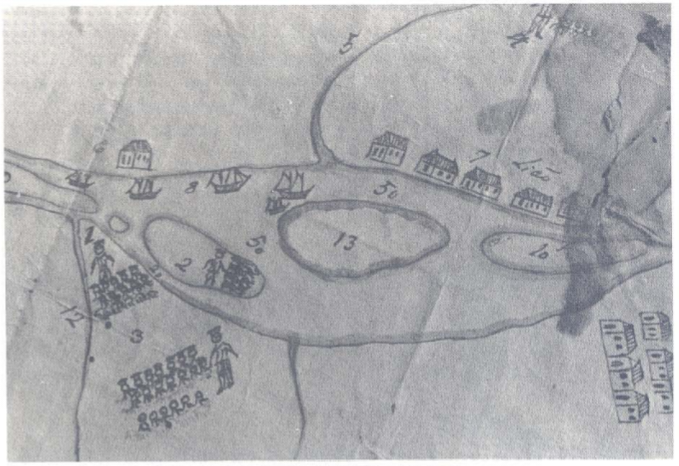
- Detail of a historical map showing troop movements during the battle
Date	3–4 October 1836
Location	Ilha do Fanfa, Triunfo, Rio Grande do Sul, Empire of Brazil 29°54′54″S 51°32′54″W
Result	Imperial victory

Belligerents
Piratini Republic	Empire of Brazil

Commanders and leaders
Bento Gonçalves (POW) (WIA)	Bento Manuel; J. P. Grenfell

Strength
1,100 men	1,000 men 1 steamer 4 gunboats

Casualties and losses
120 dead 900 men captured 16 guns captured	17 dead 72 wounded

The Battle of Fanfa, also known as Battle of Fanfa Island or the Betrayal of Fanfa, was one of the first battles of the Ragamuffin War, fought by loyalist Imperial forces under Bento Manuel Ribeiro, and Riograndense troops under Bento Gonçalves. It ended in a negotiated withdrawal for the rebel forces, who were meant to be allowed to leave the island unarmed, but in the end were imprisoned, including their leader Gonçalves.

== Background ==
Having learned that the Riograndense Republic had been proclaimed by fellow rebel Antônio de Sousa Neto and his men after their victory at the Battle of Seival, Bento Gonçalves raised the siege he had been conducting on Porto Alegre and started to move with a group of 1,000 men south towards Neto's encampment in order to join forces with him. In order to do this, they had to cross the Jacuí River, and the only available ford at that season was at the Ilha do Fanfa, in today's city of Triunfo.

The Imperial troops, under Bento Manuel Ribeiro, started to move from Triunfo, aiming to keep Gonçalves' force from crossing the river. Araújo Ribeiro, alerted by Bento Manuel, sent down ships under English mercenary John Pascoe Grenfell to block them; this force, made up by 18 vessels between gunboats and sloops, positioned itself on the island's south side, something which allowed them to stay hidden to the rebels until they had landed on the island.

== Engagement ==
On 3 October 1836, the Imperial forces advanced and surrounded the island by land. The ragamuffin troops resisted, knowing reinforcements led by Crescêncio de Carvalho were nearby. They repelled landings on the island's southern shore by the loyalists, and attempts to cross the river to the northern shore. After the Imperial infantry took a commanding hill on the island, however, they decided to negotiate, and by the next morning settled a deal where they would surrender, deliver their weapons, and be free to return to their homes. Bento Manuel later reneged on the terms, however, and arrested the rebels.

Amongst those captured were Bento Gonçalves, who had been wounded, Livio Zambeccari, Pedro Boticário, José de Almeida Corte Real, Onofre Pires and José Calvet. Bento Gonçalves would later flee from his captors at the São Marcelo Fort in 1837. Until then, the rebels were led by João Manuel de Lima e Silva militarily, and by Gomes Jardim politically.
