= Battle of Barro Vermelho =

- Part of the Ragamuffin War
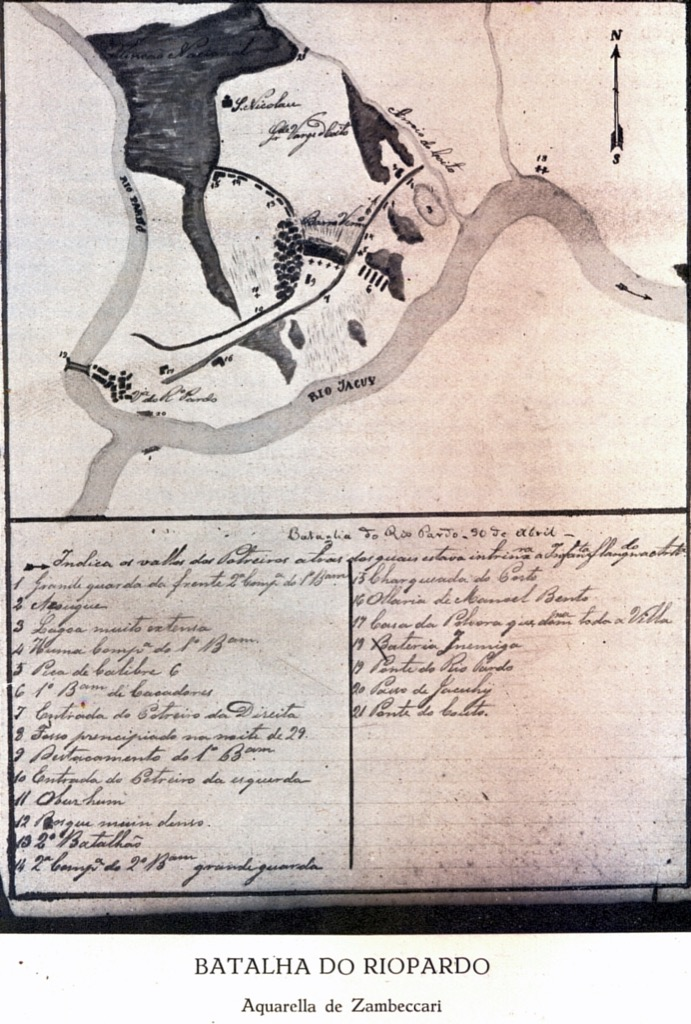
- Plan of the battle by Livio Zambeccari
Date	30 April 1838
Location	Rio Pardo, Rio Grande do Sul, Empire of Brazil 29°57′54″S 52°21′51″W
Result	Republican victory

Belligerents
Piratini Republic	Empire of Brazil

Commanders and leaders
Bento Gonçalves; C. de Carvalho; Sousa Neto	Sebastião Barreto; Xavier da Cunha; Andrade Neves

Strength
2,800 men	1,546 men

Casualties and losses
17 dead 37 wounded	370 dead 800 captured

The Battle of Barro Vermelho, also known as the Battle of Rio Pardo, was an engagement of the Ragamuffin War fought in April 1838. Around 5,000 men were present in the field, an atypically large number for the conflict; the battle was one of the rebels' most important victories during the war.

== Engagement ==
Led by Bento Gonçalves, Bento Manuel, Sousa Neto and Crescêncio de Carvalho, the Ragamuffin army attacked Rio Pardo, the city which served as the Imperial headquarters and was considered inexpugnable, in late April 1838. The battle started at 5:40 in the morning and lasted for around an hour and 20 minutes. The Imperial center broke under the attack by Neto's reserves; their artillery managed to fire only 4 or 5 salvos before being taken, while the rebel artillery only fired once, before being unable to do so any further thanks to the speed of the attack.

When the loyalist commander Marshal Sebastião Barreto realized he would not be able to hold the city, he escaped down the Jacuí River.

Once the city was taken, Sousa Neto captured a group of musicians belonging to the Imperial Army, and ordered their leader, Joaquim José Mendanha, to compose a hymn for the rebels, something which he took 5 days to do. The lyrics to it were written by Serafim Joaquim de Alencastre, a poet and captain in the ragamuffin army; this music later became the Hino Rio-Grandense.

The victory allowed the rebels to yet again siege Porto Alegre, the provincial capital. Rio Pardo would, however, be retaken in November of the same year, and some of the prisoners captured in April freed.

== Legacy ==
Today, on the battle's site, there stands a square named 30 de Abril [April 30], also known as Cruz do Barro Vermelho Square. On the battle's 100 year anniversary, a cross was raised as a monument to the fallen. In 2011, a further monument entitled "Monument to the Unknown Ragamuffin Soldier" was added to the square.
