= Uruguay campaign =

- Part of Platine War
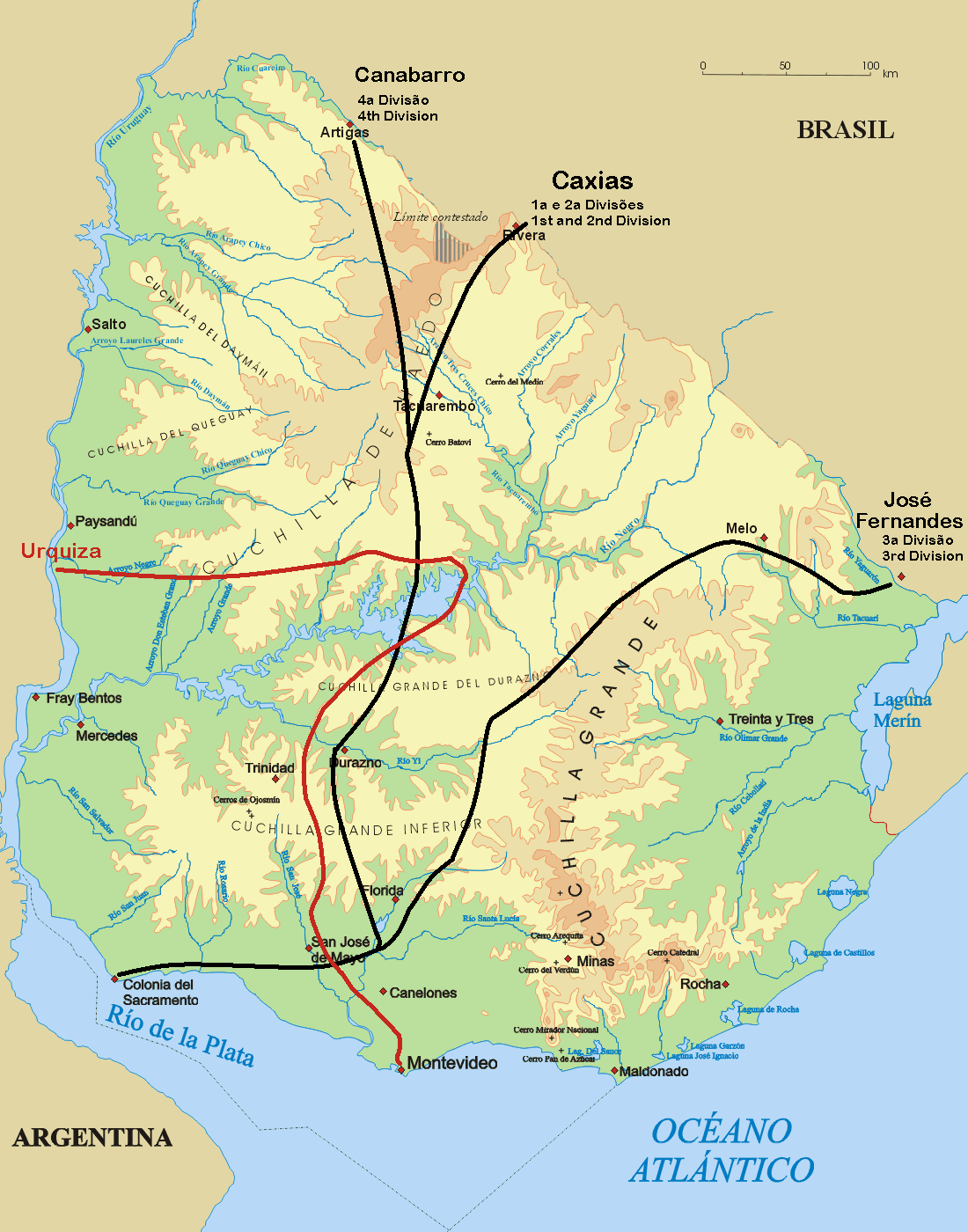
| Date | September 4 - October 19, 1851 |
| Location | Uruguay |
| Result | Allied victory: Brazilian Occupation of Uruguay; Surrender of Manuel Oribe |

Belligerents
| Empire of Brazil; Gobierno de la Defensa; Entre Ríos | Gobierno del Cerrito |

Commanders and leaders
| Count of Caxias; David Canabarro; Bento Manuel; Sousa Neto; João Caldwell; José Fernandes; Justo J. Urquiza; Joaquín Suárez | Manuel Oribe (surrendered); Timoteo Aparicio; Servando Gómez; Ignacio Oribe |

Units involved
| Imperial Brazilian Army; National Guard of Rio Grande do Sul; Imperial Brazilian Navy | Oribe Army |

Strength
| 31.200 | 8.500 |

The Uruguay campaign was a military campaign that took place during the Platine War, carried out by allied troops led by Luís Alves de Lima e Silva. The campaign's objective was to reconquer Uruguay from Manuel Oribe and to relieve the Colorado troops of Fructuoso Rivera in Montevideo.

== The Campaign ==
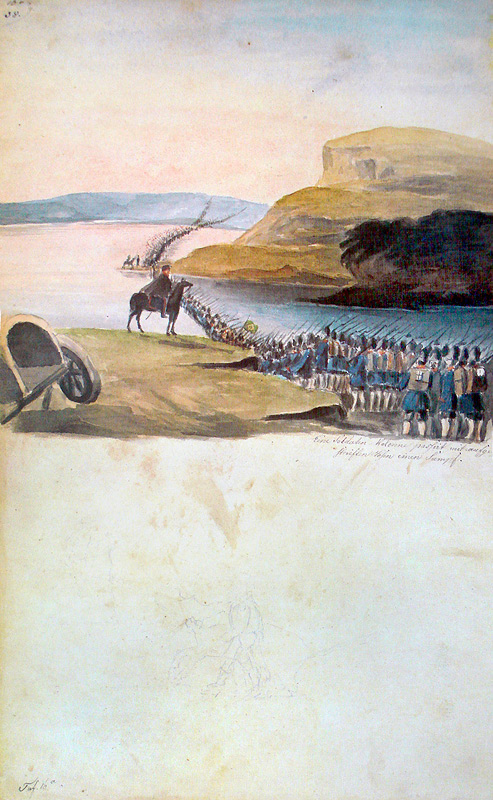
Column of Brazilian soldiers crossing a river, watercolor by Herrmann Wendroth (1852)

An army composed of 16,200 soldiers in four divisions, with 6,500 infantry, 8,900 cavalry, 800 artillerymen, and 26 cannons, including European mercenaries – the Brummer – under the command of Luís Alves de Lima e Silva, crossed the border between Rio Grande do Sul and Uruguay on September 4, 1851. Approximately 4,000 soldiers remained in Brazil to protect its border, in addition to another 17,000 men scattered throughout Brazilian territory, bringing the total strength of the Brazilian army to over 37,000 men. The Imperial Brazilian Army entered Uruguayan territory divided into three groups: the 4th Division under the command of Colonel Davi Canabarro, which departed from Quaraí and protected the right flank of the main group (the 1st and 2nd divisions with 12,000 men) under the command of the Count of Caxias himself, who had left from Santana do Livramento. A third group, the 3rd Division led by Brigadier José Fernandes dos Santos Pereira, departed from Jaguarão and protected the left flank of Caxias' forces. Canabarro's 4th Division joined Caxias' troops shortly after the Uruguayan city of San Fructuoso. Fernandes' 3rd Division joined the main force shortly before Montevideo. Meanwhile, the troops of Urquiza and Eugenio Garzón surrounded Manuel Oribe's army near Montevideo. The troops under the command of Urquiza and Garzón at that time numbered around 15,000 men, and Oribe's army around 8,500. After discovering that the Brazilians were approaching, Oribe ordered his troops to surrender without a fight. Defeated and with no possibility of continuing the war, Oribe retired to his farm in Paso del Molino.

== Brazilian Blockade ==
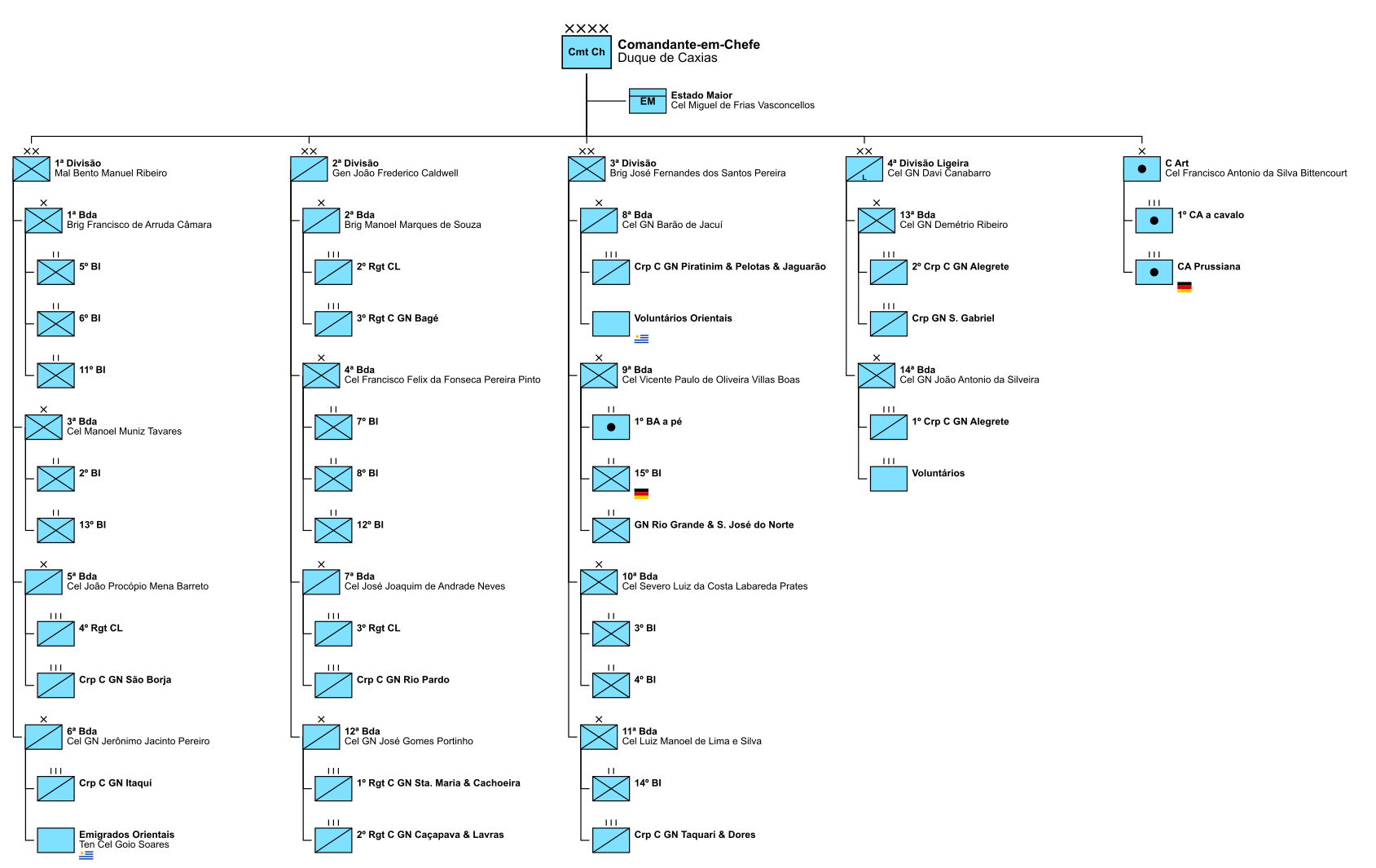
Order of Battle of the Uruguayan Campaign

The Brazilian squadron, with its ships positioned along the Rio de la Plata and its tributaries, prevented Oribe's defeated army from escaping to Argentina. Urquiza suggested to Grenfell that he kill the prisoners of war, but the Anglo-Brazilian admiral refused to harm them. Consequently, the Argentine soldiers in Oribe's army were incorporated into Urquiza's army, and the Uruguayans into Garzón's. The Brazilian army managed to cross Uruguayan territory safely after defeating Oribe's troops who attacked their flanks in several battles. On November 21, in Montevideo, representatives of Brazil, Uruguay, Entre Ríos, and Corrientes signed a treaty of alliance aimed at "liberating the Argentine people from the oppression they endure under the tyrannical rule of Governor Rosas."

== See also ==
- Great Siege of Montevideo

== Bibliography ==
- Golin, Tau (2004). A Fronteira (in Portuguese). Vol. 2. Porto Alegre: L&PM Editores. ISBN 978-85-254-1438-0.
- Pedrosa, J. F. Maya (2004). A Catástrofe dos Erros (in Portuguese). Rio de Janeiro: Biblioteca do Exército. ISBN 978-85-7011-352-8.
- Barroso, Gustavo (2000). Guerra do Rosas: 1851–1852 (in Portuguese). Fortaleza: SECULT.
- Carvalho, Affonso (1976). Caxias (in Portuguese). Brasília: Biblioteca do Exército.
- Lima, Manuel de Oliveira (1989). O Império brasileiro (in Portuguese). Belo Horizonte: Itatiaia. ISBN 978-85-319-0517-9.
- Lyra, Heitor (1977). História de Dom Pedro II (1825–1891): Ascenção (1825–1870) (in Portuguese). Vol. 1. Belo Horizonte: Itatiaia.
- Maia, João do Prado (1975). A Marinha de Guerra do Brasil na Colônia e no Império (in Portuguese) (2nd ed.). Rio de Janeiro: Livraria Editora Cátedra.
- Costa, Virgílio Pereira da Silva (2003). Duque de Caxias (in Portuguese). São Paulo: Editora Três.
