= Entre Rios =

Entre Rios (literally "Between Rivers" in Portuguese) or Entre Ríos (in Spanish) may refer to:

== Places ==
=== Argentina ===
- Entre Ríos Province, a central province of Argentina.
  - Republic of Entre Ríos, short-lived republic in the current province (1820–21)
- Isla Entre Ríos, an exclave and island in Corrientes Province

=== Bolivia ===
- Entre Ríos, Tarija, a town in the Bolivian Tarija Department.
- Entre Ríos, Cochabamba, a small town in the Cochabamba Department of the South American Andean Republic of Bolivia

=== Brazil ===
- Entre Rios, Bahia, Brazilian municipality in the state of Bahia
- Entre Rios, Santa Catarina, Brazilian municipality in the state of Santa Catarina
- Entre Rios do Oeste, Brazilian municipality in the state of Paraná
- Entre Rios do Sul, Brazilian municipality in the state of Rio Grande do Sul
- Entre Rios de Minas, municipality in the state of Minas Gerais
- Desterro de Entre Rios, Brazilian municipality in the state of Minas Gerais

== Other uses ==
- Entre Ríos (band), an Argentine indietronica band
- Entre Ríos Railway (The Entre Ríos Railway (ER)), a former British-owned railway company
- Entre Ríos/Rodolfo Walsh (Buenos Aires Metro)
