= First siege of Porto Alegre =

1836 battle of the Ragamuffin War

- Part of the Ragamuffin War
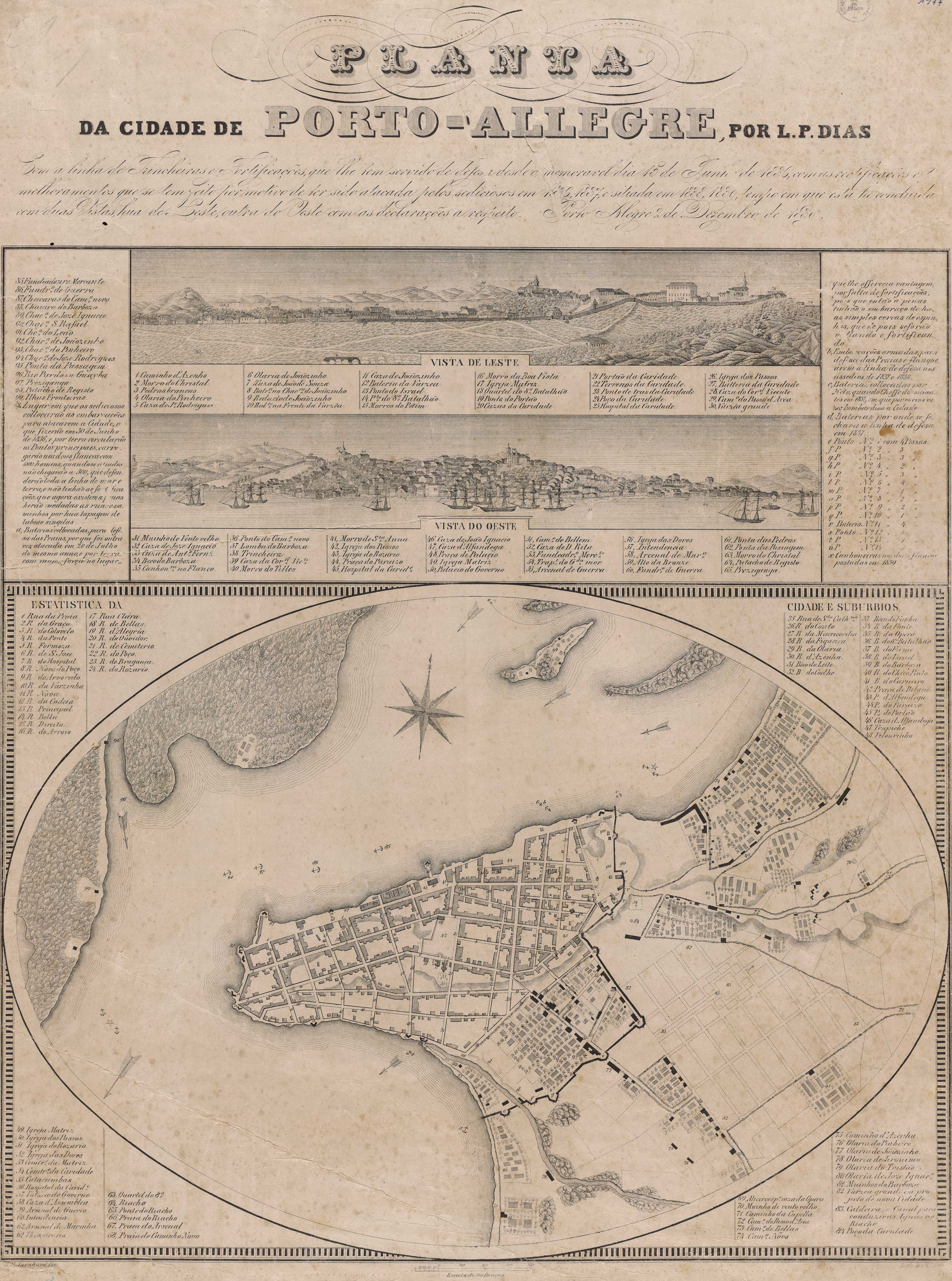
- A map of Porto Alegre in 1839, showing the trench lines around the city
Date	27 June 1836 – 18 September 1836
Location	Porto Alegre, Rio Grande do Sul, Empire of Brazil
Result	Imperial victory

Belligerents
Ragamuffin rebels	Empire of Brazil

Commanders and leaders
Bento Gonçalves	Manuel Marques de Sousa; Bento Manuel Ribeiro

Strength
3,000 men 1 brig 1 patache 1 schooner 1 yacht	1,000 men

Casualties and losses
Unknown	Unknown

The first siege of Porto Alegre was a siege carried out by rebel forces during the Ragamuffin War in southern Brazil between late June and September of 1836. Porto Alegre, the capital of Rio Grande do Sul, had fallen to rebel forces in September 1835, been retaken in a loyalist mutiny in June 15th of 1836, and a few weeks later assaulted and then besieged by a force commanded by the rebel leader, Bento Gonçalves.

Gonçalves was eventually forced to lift the siege after an attack by Imperial commander Bento Manuel Ribeiro's troops.

== Background ==
Long-standing political trouble between the local elites in Rio Grande do Sul and Imperial politicians and bureaucrats in Rio de Janeiro had led to the start of the Ragamuffin War in September 1835. One of the first actions in this conflict was the fall of Porto Alegre to the local rebels; this was an event of great importance, since Porto Alegre was a formidable defensive position, and also the provincial capital.

In June 1836, however, Manuel Marques de Sousa led a loyalist mutiny in the city. The rebel leadership was overthrown, and Imperial control resumed. Bento Gonçalves, leading 1,000 men east from nearby Triunfo, marched towards the city and demanded its surrender on June 27, supported by four warships.

== Siege ==
On June 30th, negotiations being fruitless, a rebel force attacked the city from the south, supported by the brig Bento Gonçalves and the 20 de setembro, a patache; simultaneously, another column attacked the city through the north, supported by the Farroupilha and the Onofre, a schooner and a yacht respectively. The attack was fought off by the small garrison of 300 men on barricades, supported by guns found in warehouses. Soon trenches began to be dug by the defenders around the city.

On July 20th, Bento Gonçalves tried to take Porto Alegre in a surprise attack, at 3:30 AM with 3,000 men, but the defensive works proved too strong for them. After circa two hours of fighting, the rebels withdrew to their previous positions, both on the sea and land. 8 days later, Bento Manuel Ribeiro arrived with 800 men to relieve the defenders. On the 18th of September, the defenders then sortied against the besiegers, who lifted the siege, seeing the situation growing direr as time passed and the Imperial force got reinforced further; Bento Gonçalves decided to march south towards Antônio de Sousa Neto's force, who'd recently won the important Battle of Seival.

Porto Alegre would be besieged again on May 1837 by Sousa Neto's forces.
