= Afonso Corte Real =

Afonso José de Almeida Corte Real (15 November 1805 in Rio Pardo – 11 June 1840) was a Brazilian military and revolutionary. His full name José Afonso de Almeida Corte Real.

== Biography ==
Captain Rio Pardo Dragons' son, Francisco de Borja de Almeida Corte Real, Afonso Corte Real fought in the Cisplatine War as a cadet, taking part in the Battle of Ituzaingó, which resulted in the Uruguay's independence. He participated in Ragamuffin War as one of the most active fighters and when Bento Manuel Ribeiro joined the first Empire, Corte Real was made colonel of the National Guard and went after him with Major João Manuel de Lima e Silva. Corte Real was an excellent soldier when carried any weapon. He participated in various actions such as the Battle of Seival, was arrested in the Battle of Fanfa and taken to Rio de Janeiro as a prisoner. Corte Real was prisoner at Fort Santa Cruz by one year later and after that he fled in the company of Colonel Onofre Pires. He was killed at age 34 in an ambush in the Arroio Velhaco, in the Marcos Alves Pereira Salgado's farmhouse, by an imperial force, commanded by João Patrício de Azambuja. According to a Royal Court version he would have reacted and been killed with a shot in the forehead, however other version mentioned that he matched as friend and was killed with a shot of flank who crossed his lungs and made him fall dead. Corte Real is buried in the Viamão cathedral.
