= Azenha Bridge =

Brazilian bridge

Coordinates: 30°02′51″S 51°12′49″W

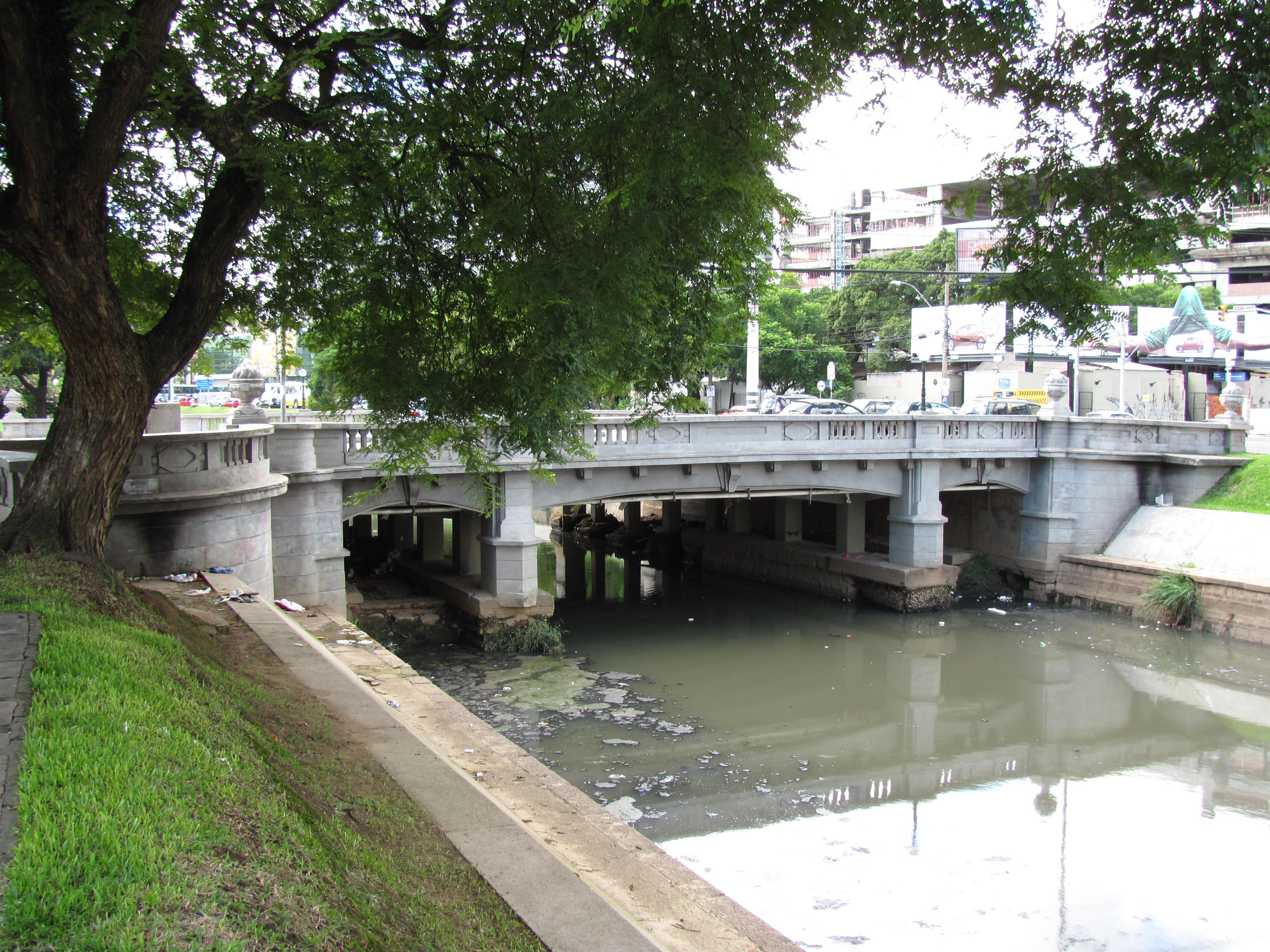
Azenha Bridge.

The Azenha Bridge (Portuguese: Ponte da Azenha) is located in the Azenha neighborhood, in the Brazilian city of Porto Alegre, in the state of Rio Grande do Sul. It is situated on the corner of Azenha and Ipiranga avenues.

== History ==
The original Azenha Bridge was built in 1777 by Francisco Antonio da Silveira, known as Chico da Azenha, an Azorean who arrived in Porto Alegre in the middle of the 18th century. The site, built above the Dilúvio Stream, connected the south to the center of Porto Alegre. The road from the bridge to the historic center became known as the Azenha Way, which today corresponds to João Pessoa and Azenha avenues.

=== Ragamuffin War ===
On the night of September 19, 1835, around two hundred rebels camped in the Azenha neighborhood from Guaíba. Led by Gomes Jardim and Onofre Pires, their aim was to invade Porto Alegre. On the 20th, the revolutionaries entered the city without encountering any opposition. Antônio Rodrigues Fernandes Braga, president of the Province of São Pedro do Rio Grande do Sul, escaped and traveled to Rio Grande. Without a fight, the revolutionaries asserted their absolute control over the city and gained a lot of support in the interior of the province. The City Council, convened extraordinarily by Bento Gonçalves on September 21, swore in Marciano Pereira Ribeiro, who was fourth in the general order of precedence of the vice-presidents of the province.

=== Restoration ===
On June 29, 2008, the Azenha Bridge reopened after renovation featuring a theatrical presentation of the historic battle between the revolutionaries and the imperials. The show was performed by actors and riders from the Movimento Tradicionalista Gaúcho (MTG) and included a performance by musician Renato Borghetti. The restoration cost R$531,000 and preserved the original features of the bridge, which was painted to prevent graffiti and given a new lighting system. However, the steps leading down to the Dilúvio Stream have been modified to prevent people from occupying the lower part of the bridge.

== See also ==
- History of Rio Grande do Sul
- Architecture of Porto Alegre
