= Recapture of Porto Alegre =

1836 battle of the Ragamuffin War

- Part of the Ragamuffin War
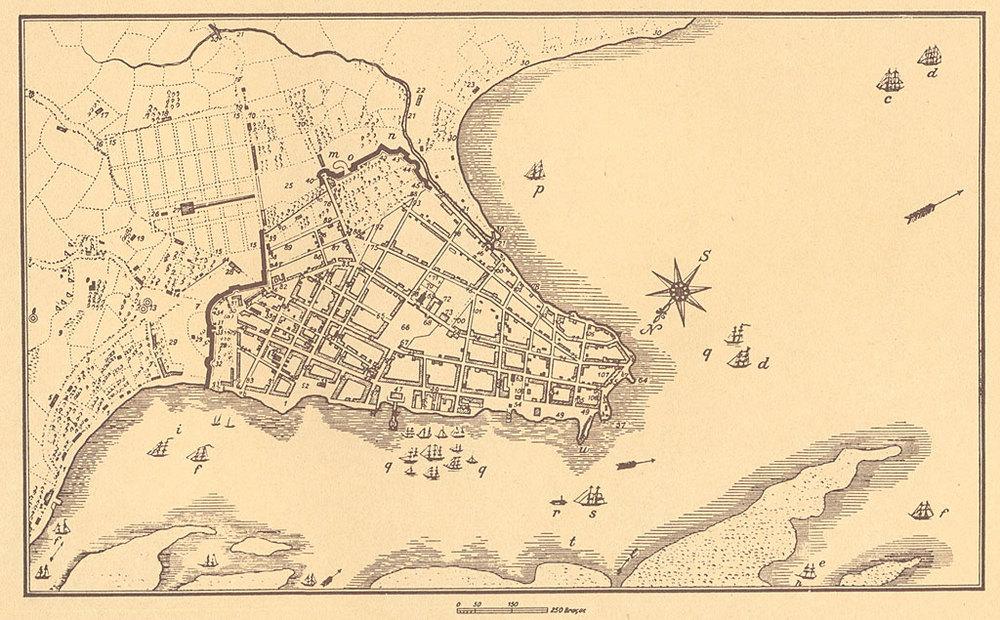
- A map of Porto Alegre in 1837
Date	June 15, 1836
Location	Porto Alegre, Rio Grande do Sul, Empire of Brazil
Result	Imperial victory

Belligerents
Ragamuffin rebels	Empire of Brazil

Commanders and leaders
Marciano Pereira Ribeiro (POW)	Manuel Marques de Sousa

Strength
Unknown	1 battalion

Casualties and losses
Unknown	Unknown

The recapture of Porto Alegre was a rising by forces loyal to the Empire of Brazil during the Ragamuffin War in June 1836. Porto Alegre, the capital of Rio Grande do Sul, had fallen to rebel forces in September 1835, and was now retaken in a mutiny led by Manuel Marques de Sousa, who had been imprisoned there.

== Background ==
Long-standing political trouble between the local elites in Rio Grande do Sul and Imperial politicians and bureaucrats in Rio de Janeiro had led to the start of the Ragamuffin War in September 1835. One of the first actions in this conflict was the fall of Porto Alegre to the local rebels; this was an event of great importance, since Porto Alegre was a formidable defensive position, and also the provincial capital.

Pelotas, another of the region's most important cities, also fell to the rebels in April 1836. With the city its commander, Manuel Marques de Sousa, also was captured; he was held captive aboard a prison ship anchored in Porto Alegre.

== Rising ==
Marques de Sousa, supported by his fellow prisoners, some of the population of Porto Alegre (chiefly German colonists from São Leopoldo), the 8th Caçadores Battalion, and the corruption of their jailors, rose up and took the city, which was only garrisoned by a police force. They arrested provincial vice-president Marciano Pereira, named so by the rebels, military governor Silvano José Monteiro de Araújo and the main revolutionaries quartered in the city. The elderly Viscount of São Gabriel, who aided the rising, took up military command of the city.

Soon afterwards, Bento Gonçalves marched towards the capital, asked for its surrender and then tried to take it by force; after this failed, he besieged it, only lifting this siege after the rebel victory in the Battle of Seival.
