= Antônio Rodrigues Fernandes Braga =

Brazilian judge and politician (1805–1875)

Antônio Fernandes Braga
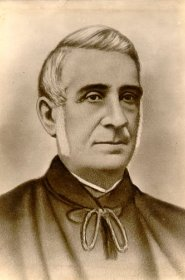

President of Rio Grande do Sul
- In office 2 May 1834 – 21 September 1835
- Preceded by: José Mariani
- Succeeded by: Marciano Ribeiro

Personal details
- Born: 1805 São Pedro do Sul, Rio Grande do Sul, State of Brazil
- Died: February 26, 1875 Rio de Janeiro, Empire of Brazil
- Education: University of Coimbra

Antônio Rodrigues Fernandes Braga (1805 – 26 February 1875) was a Brazilian judge, county ombudsman, and politician. He was a general deputy to the General Assembly and the provincial governor of the province of Rio Grande do Sul from 2 May 1834 to 21 September 1835. He was the provincial governor at the outbreak of the Ragamuffin War in Rio Grande do Sul. He also served as a senator from Rio Grande do Sul and as a justice to the Supreme Court of Justice, nominated to the latter by imperial letter on 27 April 1870 and serving from 1870 to his death in 1875.

== Biography ==
The son of Antônio Rodrigues Fernandes Braga and Ana Joaquina da Silva, Braga was born in the village of São Pedro do Sul, then part of Santa Maria, in 1805. He came from a landed family in the region. He began attending classes at the University of Coimbra in Portugal in October 1822, graduating with a law degree on 15 June 1827.

Fernandes Braga was chosen in 1835 to become the new president of Rio Grande do Sul, despite having spent a large portion of his life in Europe, to the extent that he did not have strong connections to the province. His appointment initially pleased the more liberal elements of Rio Grande do Sul. However, he started to increasingly antagonize the liberal segments of society, including claiming during a session of the provincial assembly that the most radical elements of the movement were threatening to overthrow the provincial government and unite the province with Uruguay. During his speeches he mentioned Bento Gonçalves by name. Despite his efforts to calm the situation down afterwards, his rhetoric escalated tensions in the region, contributing to the outbreak of the Ragamuffin War.

Leaders among the rebels, dubbed the farrapos, chose on 18 September 1835 to depose Fernandes Braga within two days, and so began to march towards Porto Alegre. The manifesto of Bento Gonçalves later cited this as the sole goal of the rebellion in its initial stages. This resulted in the Battle of Azenha Bridge, the first battle of the war.

As the rebel forces began to move towards Porto Alegre, Fernandes Braga caught wind of their advances and so ordered the local municipal and national guard garrisons to stand and arm themselves, later including the citizens of Porto Alegre with these orders, but with little success. This would later become known as the Capture of Porto Alegre. With Bento Gonçalves marching into Porto Alegre on 20 September 1835 and with little in the way of weapons or manpower, Fernandes Braga fled to the city of Rio Grande, which turned into the base of operations for the Empire of Brazil in Rio Grande do Sul during this time period.

The rebels elected Marciano José Pereira Ribeiro as the new president of Rio Grande do Sul. Fernandes Braga later attempted to travel on the schooner Rio-Grandense to Pelotas to gather support, but was arrested. He was later released and sailed to Rio de Janeiro.

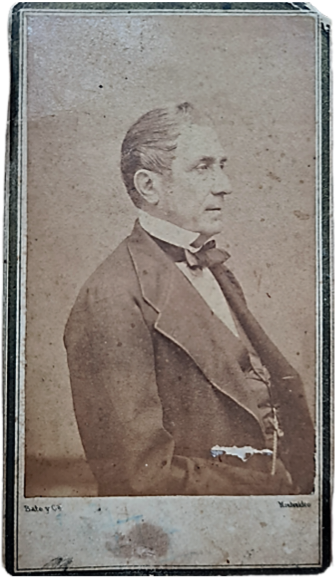
Fernandes Braga, c. 1861–1865

Political offices
Preceded by José Mariani	President of the province of Rio Grande do Sul; 1834–1835	Succeeded by Marciano José Pereira Ribeiro
