= Entre Rios do Sul =

Municipality in Rio Grande do Sul, Brazil

Coordinates: 27°31′40″S 52°43′58″W

- Municipality
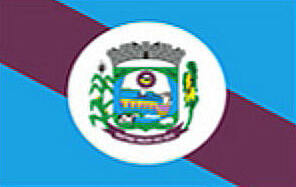
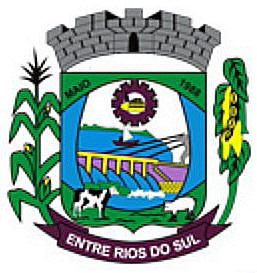
- Flag Coat of arms
- Interactive map of Entre Rios do Sul
- Country: Brazil
- Time zone: UTC−3 (BRT)

Entre Rios do Sul is a municipality in the state of Rio Grande do Sul, Brazil. As of 2020, the estimated population was 2,758.

== See also ==
- List of municipalities in Rio Grande do Sul
