= Entre Rios, Santa Catarina =

Entre Rios
- Municipality
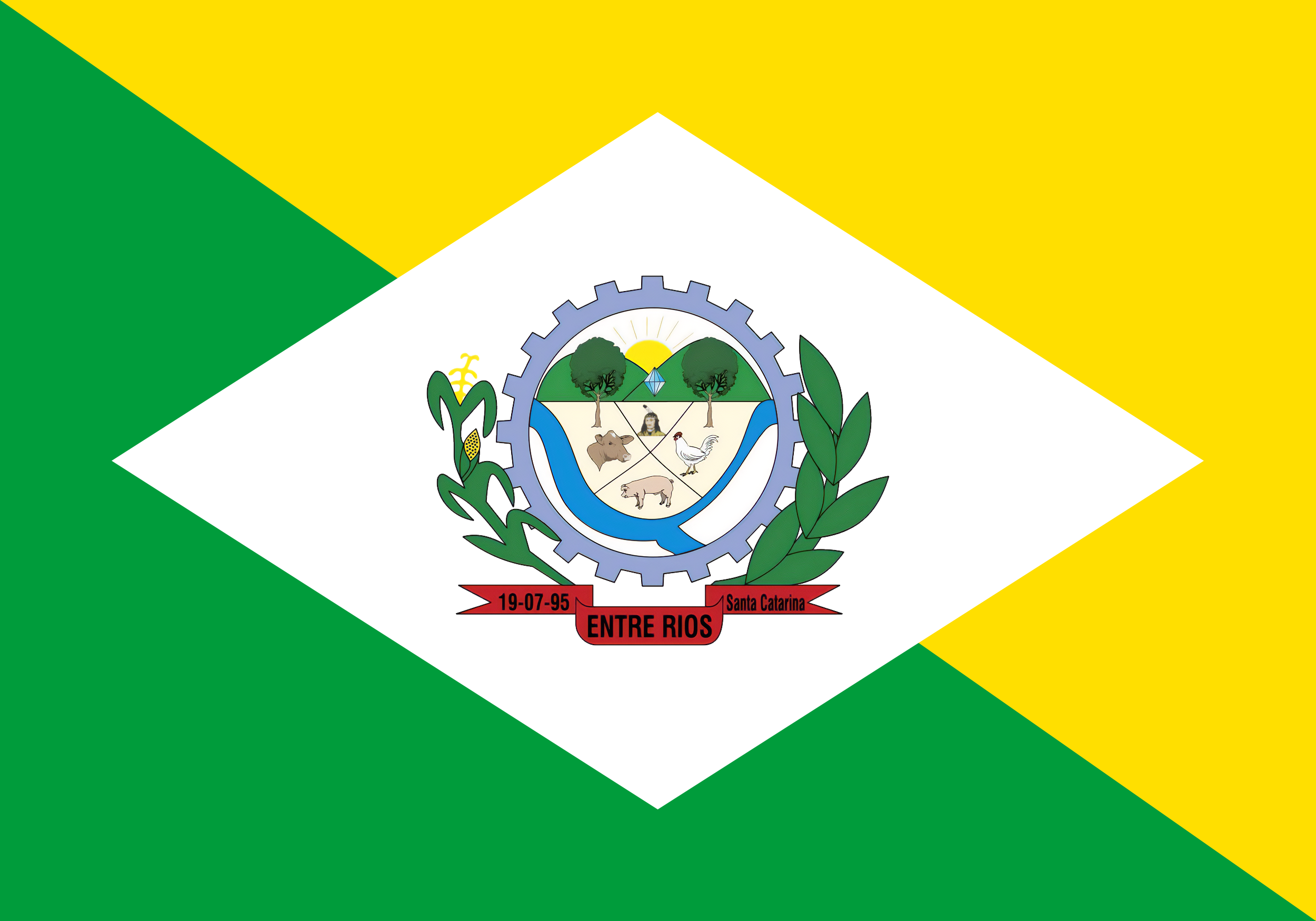
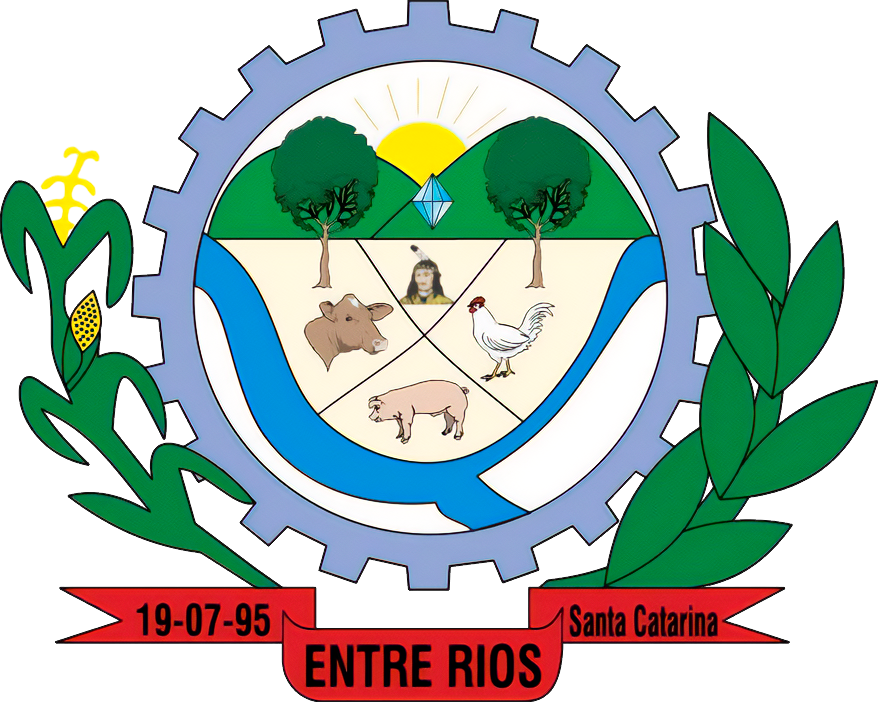
- Flag Coat of arms

- Location in Brazil
- Coordinates: 26°43′26″S 52°33′39″W
- Country: Brazil
- Region: South
- State: Santa Catarina
- Mesoregion: Oeste Catarinense

Population (2020)
  - Total: 3,218
- Time zone: UTC -3
- Website: www.entrerios.sc.gov.br

Entre Rios is a municipality in the state of Santa Catarina in the South region of Brazil. It was created in 1995 out the existing municipality of Marema.

== See also ==
- List of municipalities in Santa Catarina
