= Entre Rios do Oeste =

- Municipality
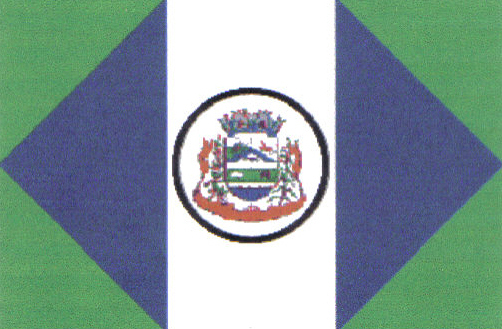
- Flag

- Location in Brazil
- Coordinates: 24°42′14″S 54°14′32″W
- Country: Brazil
- Region: Southern
- State: Paraná
- Mesoregion: Oeste Paranaense

Population (2020)
  - Total: 4,596
- Time zone: UTC−3 (BRT)

Entre Rios do Oeste is a municipality in the state of Paraná in the Southern Region of Brazil.

== See also ==
- List of municipalities in Paraná
