= Battle of Seival =

Pivotal battle of the Ragamuffin War

- Part of the Ragamuffin War
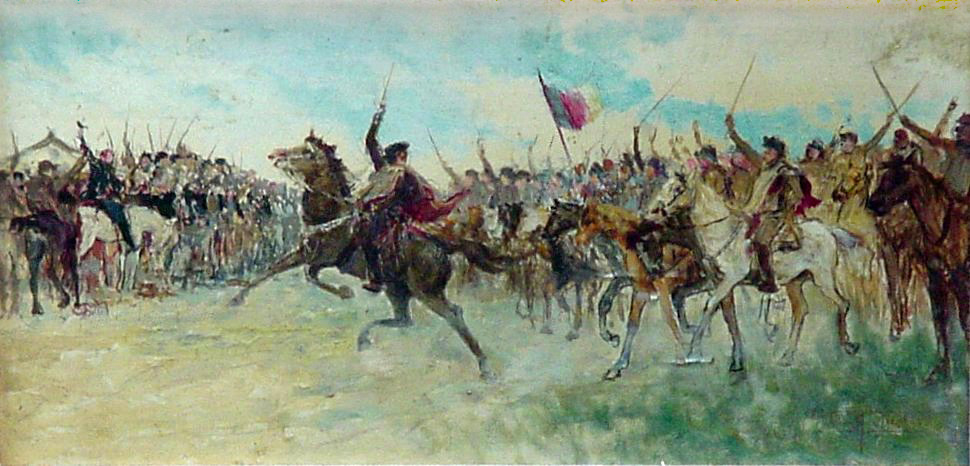
- Proclamation of the Piratini Republic, by Antônio Parreiras
Date	10 September 1836
Location	Seival Hill, Bagé, Rio Grande do Sul, Empire of Brazil 31°25′8″S 53°43′33″W
Result	Rebel victory

Belligerents
Ragamuffin rebels	Empire of Brazil

Commanders and leaders
Antônio de Sousa Neto; Joaquim Pedro Soares	João da Silva Tavares; J. F. Caldwell (POW)

Strength
430 men	500–560 men

Casualties and losses
26 killed 8 wounded	118–167 or 180 killed 60 wounded 116 captured

The Battle of Seival took place on 10 September 1836 between Ragamuffin rebels and forces loyal to the Empire of Brazil during the Ragamuffin War's early stages; the rebel victory in this battle led to the proclamation of the Riograndense Republic as a breakwaway state from the Empire of Brazil.

== Background and engagement ==
Initially aiming to topple the provincial president, the gaucho rebels faced a loyalist Imperial force. A detachment of the former, led by Colonel Antônio de Sousa Neto, moved to Bagé in early September 1836, where troops under João da Silva Tavares were encamped, having arrived from the Uruguayan border. Neto's first brigade, 430 men strong, crossed the Seival stream on September 10th and met Silva Tavares' troops in a field. The Imperial troops advanced and a melee ensued.

Initially, the loyalist force had the upper hand, but Silva Tavares's horse had its bridle broken in the fight and ran off at speed, making it seem like he was fleeing from the battle. This caused confusion amongst his men, something which was exploited by the rebels, who started to push them back and soon defeated them with light losses. Amongst the Imperial prisoners was João Frederico Caldwell.

== Aftermath ==
After the battle, Neto and his men proclaimed a republic, separate from Brazil, which would be the Riograndense Republic, also known as the Piratini Republic from its capital, Piratini, close to where the battle took place. This was done without rebel leader Bento Gonçalves's assent, as he had been engaged at the siege of Porto Alegre and would later be arrested at the Battle of Fanfa.
