= Hino Rio-Grandense =

English: Anthem of Rio Grande do Sul
- State anthem of Rio Grande do Sul, Brazil.
- Also known as: Hino Farroupilha (English: Farroupilha anthem)
- Lyrics: Francisco Pinto da Fontoura, before 1858
- Music: Joaquim José Mendanha, Ragamuffin War
- Adopted: 5 January 1966

Hino Rio-Grandense is the anthem of the Brazilian state of Rio Grande do Sul. It is also called Hino Farroupilha due to the historical period that the anthem was written in, during the Ragamuffin War. The melody was composed by Joaquim José Mendanha, the lyrics by Francisco Pinto da Fontoura and harmonization by Antonio Corte Real. The original lyrics passed for a lot of changes and the current were adopted on 5 January 1966 in the period of the military government|

== Lyrics ==
Portuguese lyrics	English translation	English version
First chorus
Como a aurora precursora Do farol da divindade Foi o vinte de setembro O precursor da liberdade Mostremos valor, constância Nesta ímpia e injusta guerra Sirvam nossas façanhas De modelo a toda terra De modelo a toda terra Sirvam nossas façanhas De modelo a toda terra	Like the dawn preceding The beacon of divinity Was the twentieth of September; The precursor of liberty Let us show valor, perseverance In this impious, unjust war May our prowess serve As a model to every land As a model to every land May our prowess serve As a model to every land	Like the dawn that heralded The beacon of divinity Was September the twentieth The herald of our Liberty Let us show then valor, constancy In this impious, unjust war May our prowess serve As a model for the world As a model for the world May our prowess serve As a model for the world
Second chorus (excluded since 1966)
Entre nós reviva Atenas; Para assombro dos tiranos Sejamos gregos na glória E na virtude, romanos Mostremos valor, constância Nesta ímpia e injusta guerra Sirvam nossas façanhas De modelo a toda terra De modelo a toda terra Sirvam nossas façanhas De modelo a toda terra	May Athens be reborn among us For the tyrants' haunt May we be greeks in glory And in virtue, romans Let us show valor, perseverance In this impious, unjust war May our prowess serve As a model to every land As a model to every land May our prowess serve As a model to every land	May among us resurge Athens; For the tyrants' haunt May we be greeks in glory And in virtue, romans Let us show then valor, constancy In this impious, unjust war May our prowess serve As a model for the world As a model for the world May our prowess serve As a model for the world
Third chorus
Mas não basta pra ser livre Ser forte, aguerrido e bravo Povo que não tem virtude Acaba por ser escravo Mostremos valor, constância Nesta ímpia e injusta guerra Sirvam nossas façanhas De modelo a toda terra De modelo a toda terra Sirvam nossas façanhas De modelo a toda terra	But, to be free, it is not enough To be strong, fearless and brave (For) People without virtue End up being enslaved Let us show valor, perseverance In this impious, unjust war May our prowess serve As a model to every land As a model to every land May our prowess serve As a model to every land	But it won't suffice to be free Being strong, bold and brave People who lack virtue Are fated to be enslaved Let us show then valor, constancy In this impious, unjust war May our prowess serve As a model for the world As a model for the world May our prowess serve As a model for the world
