= Sebastião Barreto Pereira Pinto =

Brazilian politician

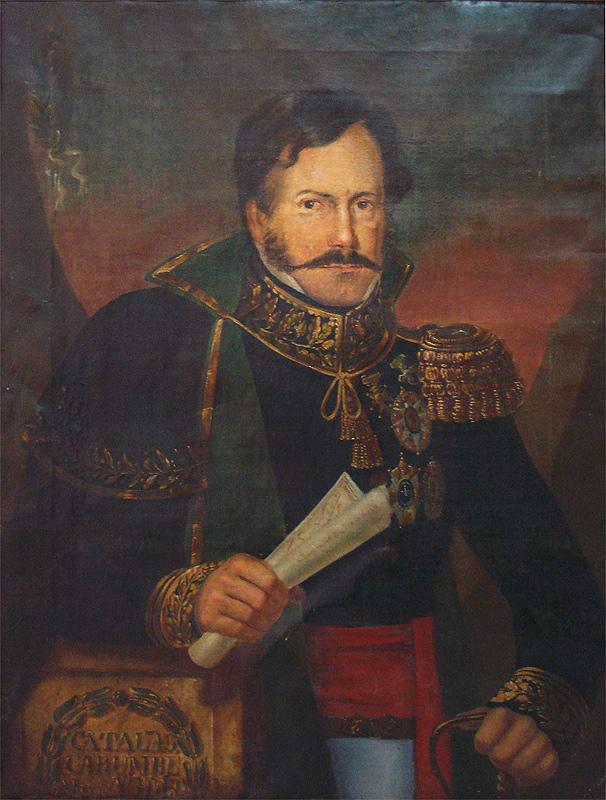
- Portrait attributed to Porto Alegre, c. 1830–31

President of Minas Gerais
- In office 22 August 1840 – April 1841
- Monarch: Pedro II
- Preceded by: Bernardo Jacinto da Veiga
- Succeeded by: Manuel Machado Nunes

Personal details
- Born: 1775 Porto Alegre, State of Brazil
- Died: 1841 (aged 66) Porto Alegre, Empire of Brazil
- Occupation: Military officer; politician

Military service
- Allegiance: Empire of Brazil
- Branch/service: Imperial Brazilian Army
- Years of service: 1791–1841
- Battles/wars: War of the Oranges; Portuguese invasion of the Banda Oriental (1811–1812); Portuguese conquest of the Banda Oriental; Brazilian War of Independence; Cisplatine War; Battle of Camacuã; Ragamuffin War; Battle of Barro Vermelho

Sebastião Barreto Pereira Pinto (1775–1841) was a Brazilian military officer and politician.

== Biography ==
Sebastião Barreto Pereira Pinto was born in Porto Alegre in 1775.

He enlisted in the Rio Pardo Dragoons Regiment on 18 October 1791, serving in the campaigns of 1801, 1811–1812, 1816, the Cisplatine War, the Brazilian War of Independence, and the Ragamuffin War.

In 1823, in Montevideo, he fought against Portuguese general Álvaro da Costa, who opposed Brazil's independence.

He was elected provincial deputy to the 1st Legislature of the Provincial Legislative Assembly of Rio Grande do Sul. At the start of the Ragamuffin War, he was the commander of arms of the province and was stationed in Livramento. When the new president, Marciano Pereira Ribeiro, supported by the rebels, took office, Barreto was removed from command and took refuge in Uruguay.

Upon returning from Montevideo, he resumed command of the troops on 15 April 1837, but was successively defeated by the Ragamuffins at the fields of Atanagildo and in the Battle of Barro Vermelho on 30 April 1838, in which Rio Pardo (until then known as the "Undefeated Palisade") was taken by the rebels. Because of the defeat, he was subjected to a court-martial but was acquitted.

He was appointed president of the province of Minas Gerais by imperial decree on 29 July 1840, taking office on 22 August and serving until April of the following year.

He died in 1841, at the age of 66.
