= Marciano José Pereira Ribeiro =

Brazilian physician and politician

President of Rio Grande do Sul
- In office 28 March 1836 – 15 June 1836
- Preceded by: Américo de Melo
- Succeeded by: José de Araújo Ribeiro
- In office 21 September 1835 – 16 February 1836
- Preceded by: Antônio Rodrigues Fernandes Braga
- Succeeded by: Américo de Melo

Personal details
- Died: 4 March 1840 São Gabriel, Rio Grande do Sul

Marciano José Pereira Ribeiro (died 4 March 1840) was a Brazilian medical doctor and politician. He was the president of Rio Grande do Sul in two terms in 1835 and 1836.

Originally from Minas Gerais, Ribeiro graduated from medicine in Edinburgh. A republican, he was a provincial deputy to the first provincial assembly of Rio Grande do Sul. He was also the assembly's first president and presided over its first convening. He was the third vice president of Rio Grande do Sul when the Ragamuffin War commenced and the rebels, dubbed the farrapos, took the capital Porto Alegre.

Ribeiro was considered the most trustworthy of the vice presidents of the state at that time. For this, he was elected vice president by the rebels after the overthrowing of the previous president, Antônio Rodrigues Fernandes Braga. During this time period, he had João Manuel de Lima e Silva as an advisor to the Commander of Arms provincial office. He was arrested in 1836, after the city was taken by imperialist forces, and sent to Rio de Janeiro. He escaped in 1840 and found his way back to Rio Grande do Sul, and to São Gabriel in particular, but by then his health had largely deteriorated. He died on 4 March 1840.

Political offices
| Preceded by Antônio Rodrigues Fernandes Braga | President of the province of Rio Grande do Sul; 1835–1836 | Succeeded by Américo de Melo |
| Preceded by Américo de Melo | President of the province of Rio Grande do Sul; 1836 | Succeeded by José de Araújo Ribeiro |
