= Capture of Porto Alegre =

1835 rebellion in Brazil

- Part of the Ragamuffin War
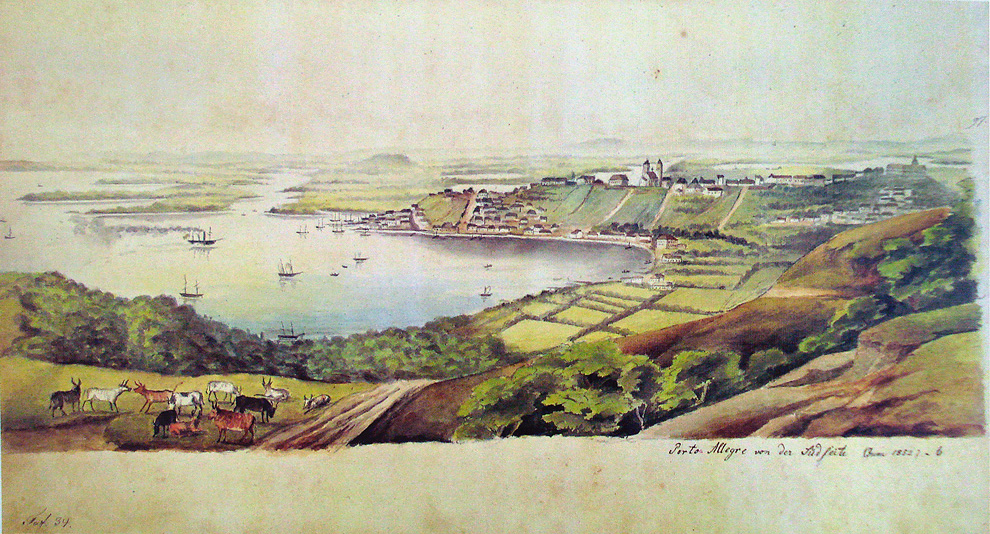
- Porto Alegre, 1852, by Herrmann Wendroth
Date	20 September 1835
Location	Porto Alegre, Rio Grande do Sul, Empire of Brazil
Result	Rebel victory

Belligerents
Liberal rebels	Empire of Brazil

Commanders and leaders
Bento Gonçalves; Gomes Jardim; Onofre Pires	Antônio Braga; José E. Gordilho

Strength
~300 men	~270 soldiers

The capture of Porto Alegre was one of the starting points of the Ragamuffin War. It took place on 20 September 1835, the day after the Battle of Azenha Bridge. Its date has been celebrated as a state holiday in Rio Grande do Sul since 1995 and also marks the end of Farroupilha Week, between the 14th and 20th of September.

== The capture ==
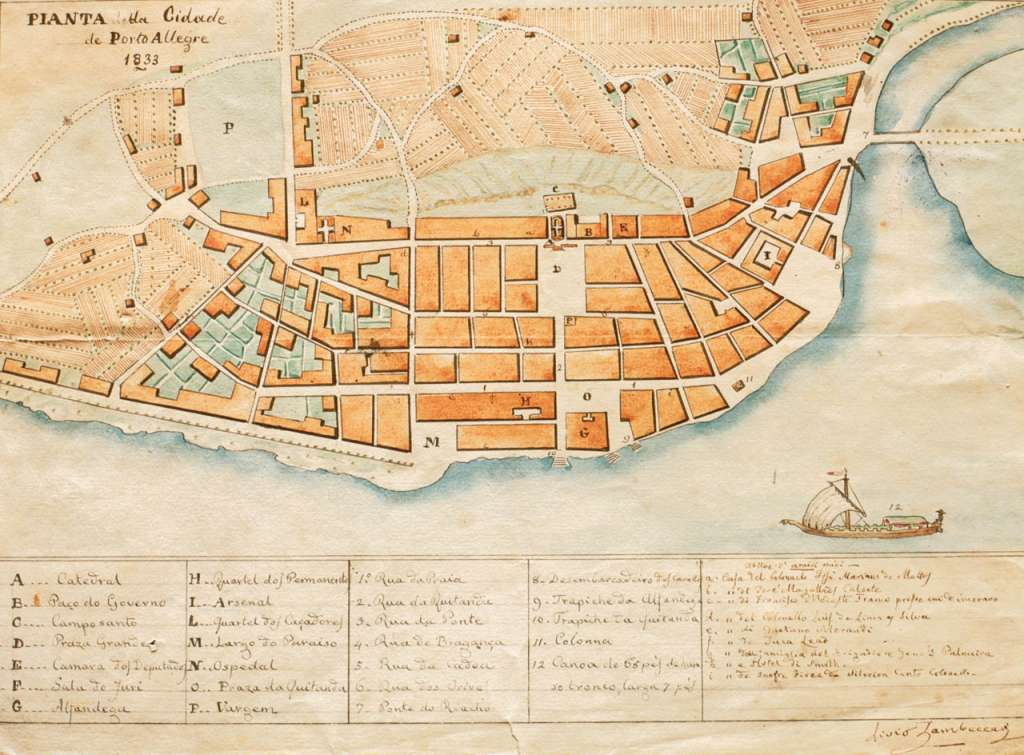
Plan of the city of Porto Alegre made in 1833 by Livio Zambeccari

After the disbandment of the forces of José Egídio Gordilho, the Viscount of Camamu, in the battle of Azenha Bridge on the night of 19 to 20 of September 1835, the rebels decided to capture Porto Alegre. On the morning of the 20th, they penetrated the perimeter of the city, without resistance, with support of the National Guard and reinforcements of around 300 men from captain Manuel Antunes de Porciúncula (Bento Gonçalves' brother-in-law). Bento Gonçalves had proposed Porciúncula to command the police corps before the 30th of November, which was rejected by Antônio Rodrigues Fernandes Braga, the president of the province.

Tensions rose, the police (called Corpo de Permanentes) deserted. Antônio Braga tried to resist in the War Arsenal, but without success. The population joined the rebels after they entered the city, which was followed by officers and soldiers, while others fled to ships in the port. Braga then boarded the schooner Rio-Grandense and headed for Pelotas in search of support. There he arrested, under suspicion of wanting to act on him, Domingos José de Almeida, who he transported to Rio Grande, releasing him only when the rebellion was victorious, after which he was forced to sail for Rio de Janeiro.

Once the government was deposed, the City Council, extraordinarily convened by Bento Gonçalves on 21 September, inaugurated Marciano José Pereira Ribeiro, a physician from Minas Gerais and fourth in the general order of precedence of vice-presidents of the province, as the new provincial president. According to Bento Gonçalves' manifesto, released on 25 September 1835, the rebellion's goal was only to remove Antônio Braga as president of the province.

== Aftermath ==
The rebellion prevailed, without resistance, in all other places in the province, with the exception of the following:

Rio Pardo resisted until 30 September, under the leadership of marshal João de Deus Mena Barreto, Viscount of São Gabriel. Barreto capitulated in the presence of Bento Gonçalves and with reinforcements from the National Guard from Cachoeira and Triunfo.

In São Gabriel, there was resistance until 4 October 1835, when the 3rd Regiment of Line Cavalry joined the rebels, led by lieutenant colonel and later general João Antônio da Silveira. The fall of São Gabriel dissuaded the reaction of the Commander of Arms, followed by his internment in Uruguay, when he saw the 2nd Regiment of Line Cavalry of Bagé join the rebels in Batovi. He was replaced in office by rebel colonel Bento Manuel Ribeiro, his personal enemy.

The strongest reaction took place in Herval, from lieutenant colonel João da Silva Tavares, who started to dominate the area between Jaguarão and Pelotas with a group of men from his family. He launched himself against captain Domingos Crescencio de Carvalho, who had joined the rebellion with the 4th Regiment of Line Cavalry, from Jaguarão, forcing him to emigrate. Later, on 16 October, captain Crescêncio defeated Silva Tavares at Retiro, on the Pelotas stream, next to present-day Pelotas.

Major Manuel Marques de Sousa protected Pelotas, which resisted the rebellion as it had been highly regarded by president Antônio Braga, who elevated it to the status of city. Marques de Sousa, later Count of Porto Alegre, had the last reaction, by defeating captain Manuel Antunes de Porciúncula on 14 October 1835, in the Battle of Arroio Grande, near Pelotas. He would, however, be captured after Pelotas fell in 1836 - this would eventually lead to Porto Alegre falling to the Empire, as it would be a rising led by Marques de Sousa that would restore Imperial power to the city in June 1836.
