= Antônio de Sousa Neto =

Brazilian politician (1801–1866)

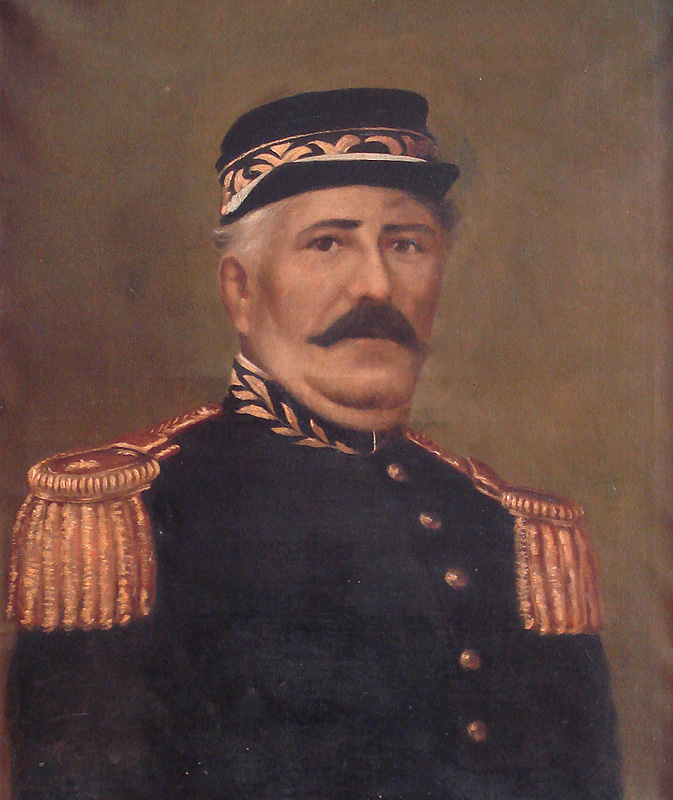
- Portrait of Antônio de Sousa Neto by Azevedo Dutra. Júlio de Castilhos Museum

Personal details
- Born: 11 February 1801 Rio Grande, Principality of Brazil
- Died: 2 July 1866 (aged 65) Corrientes, Argentina

Military service
- Allegiance: Piratini Republic; Empire of Brazil
- Branch/service: Farroupilha Army; Imperial Brazilian Army
- Rank: General
- Battles/wars: Ragamuffin War: Platine War; Uruguay Campaign; Uruguayan War; Paraguayan War; Humaitá campaign; Battle of Paso de Patria; Battle of Tuyutí (WIA)

General Antônio de Sousa Neto (Brazilian Portuguese pronunciation: [ɐ̃ˈtoni.u d(ʒi) ˈsowzɐ ˈnɛtu, ɐ̃ˈtonju -]; 11 February 1803 – 2 July 1866) was a Brazilian military leader of the Riograndense Republic during the Ragamuffin War. On 20 September 1836, Neto declared the independence of the Riograndense Republic.

He was a famous abolitionist and fought for the release of the slaves who had fought during the revolution.

The general's story is depicted in the 2001 movie Netto perde sua alma (Netto Loses His Soul), featuring Tiago Real, Werner Schünemann, Anderson Simões, Lisa Becker, Letícia Liesenfeld, Álvaro Rosa Costa, Fábio Neto, Laura Schneider, Márcia do Canto and João Máximo.
