= Bento Manuel Ribeiro =

Brazilian military officer

Bento Manuel
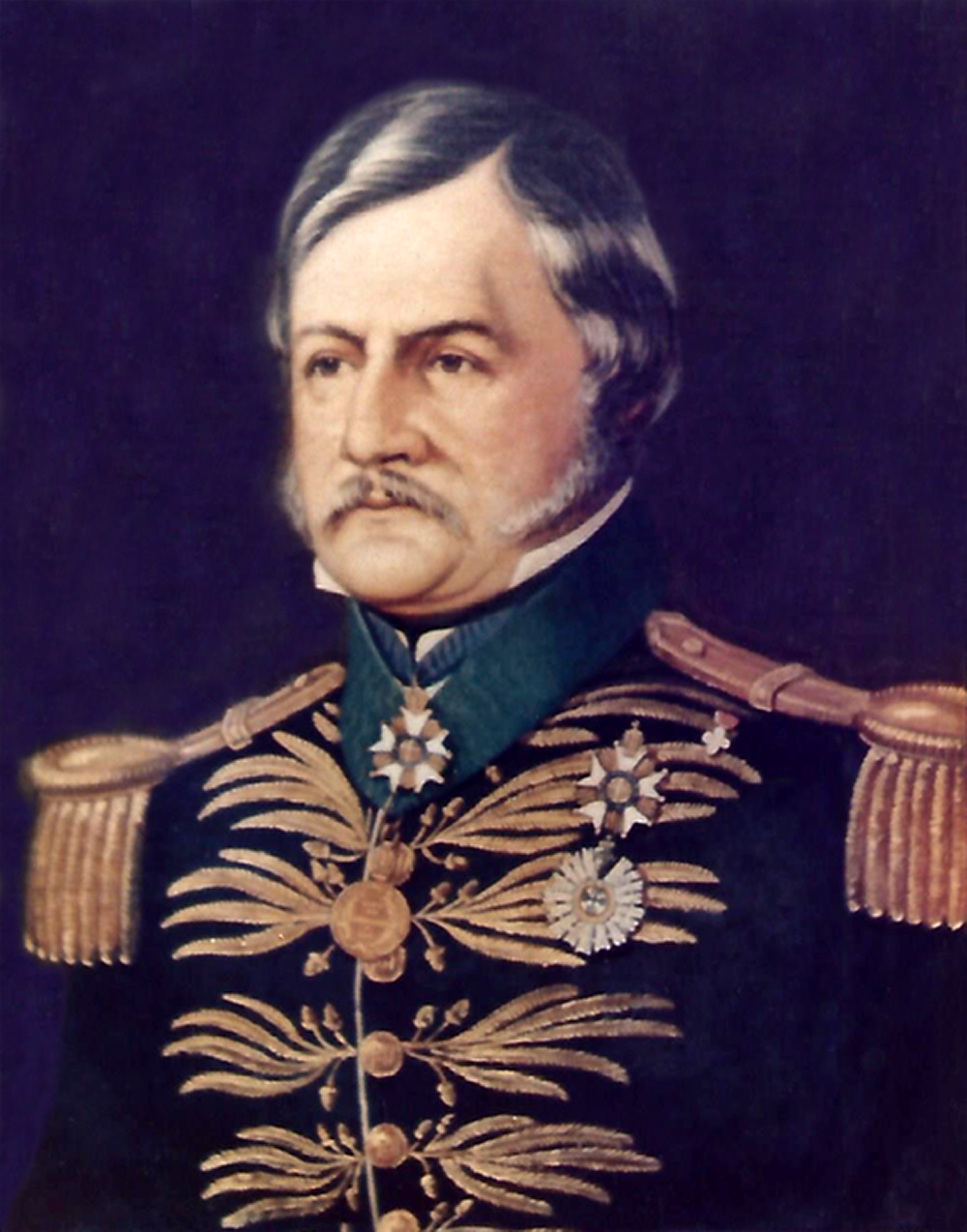
- Portrait of Bento Manuel Ribeiro
- Born: 1783; Sorocaba, Brazil
- Died: 30 May 1855 (aged 71–72); Porto Alegre, Brazil
- Military career
- Allegiance: Empire of Brazil
- Rank: Army marshal
- Conflicts: Portuguese invasion of the Banda Oriental (1811–12); Portuguese conquest of the Banda Oriental; Brazilian War of Independence; Cisplatine War; Ragamuffin War; Uruguayan Civil War; Platine War

Bento Manuel Ribeiro (1783 – 30 May 1855) was a Brazilian military officer, who participated in some key military campaigns of the history of Brazil such as the Cisplatine War and the Ragamuffin War.

== Biography ==
Bento Manuel Ribeiro was the son of Manuel Ribeiro de Almeida, a tropeiro, and Ana Maria Bueno. On December 1, 1800 he enlisted in the Rio Pardo militia regiment. He fought in the War of the Oranges against the Spanish as a soldier, accompanied by his brother Captain Gabriel Ribeiro de Almeida. Under the leadership of Colonel Patrício José Correia da Câmara, he participated in the expulsion of the Spanish troops from Batovi and from the fortress of Santa Tecla.

He participated in the First Cisplatine Campaign (1811–1812), such as quartermaster, being promoted to lieutenant in 1813. In the War against Artigas he served under the command of General Joaquim Xavier Curado.

During the Ragamuffin War he switched sides twice, ending on the Imperial one; he was described as faithful at the balance of the conflict. In the Guerra Grande (Great War), and also during the Ragamuffin War, he led the Farroupilha that supported Fructuoso Rivera.

== Personal life ==
He married in Caçapava do Sul on September 15, 1807 with Maria Manso da Conceição, daughter of Antonio Manso Monteiro and Ana Maria Martins. He was the grandfather of Bento Manuel Ribeiro Carneiro Monteiro, mayor of the city of Rio de Janeiro and also a military commander.

Bento Manuel Ribeiro died in Porto Alegre in 1855, being a rich estancieiro. His grave is located at the entrance of the cemetery in Uruguaiana.

== Bibliography ==
- Da Silva, Alfredo P.M. (1906). Os Generais do Exército Brasileiro, 1822 a 1889, Vol.1 (in Portuguese). Rio de Janeiro: M. Orosco & Co.
