= Bento Gonçalves da Silva =

First President of the Riograndense Republic

Bento Gonçalves
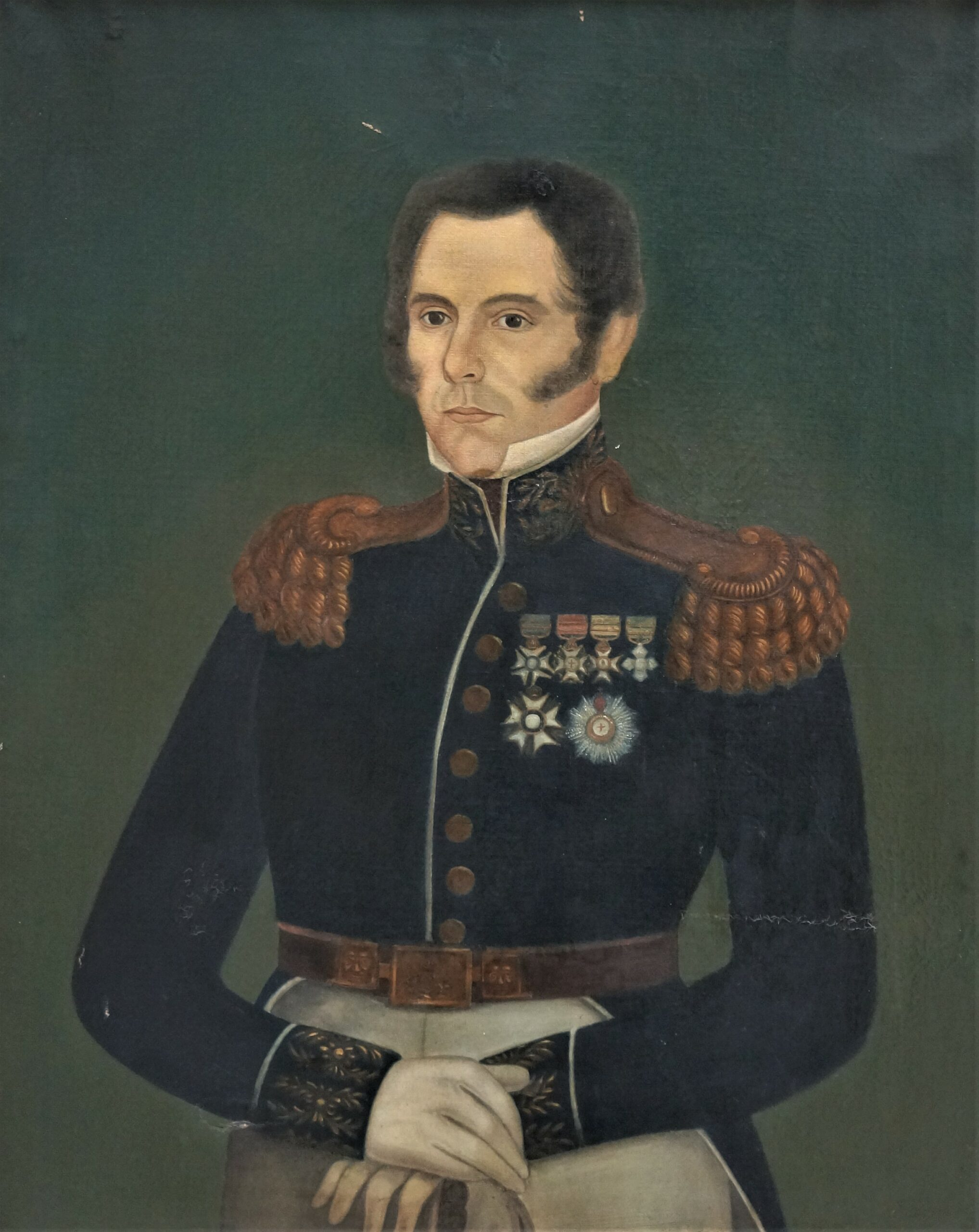
- Portrait, c. 1844–46 (Note: One of the two authenticated images of Bento, together with a daguerreotype.)

President of the Riograndense Republic
- In office 6 November 1836 – 1841
- Vice President: Gomes Jardim
- Preceded by: Office established
- Succeeded by: Gomes Jardim

Personal details
- Born: 23 September 1788 Triunfo, Rio Grande do Sul, State of Brazil
- Died: 18 July 1847 (aged 58) Pedras Brancas, Rio Grande do Sul, Empire of Brazil
- Party: Ragamuffin Party
- Spouse: Cayetana Juana Francisca García González

Military service
- Allegiance: Kingdom of Portugal; United Kingdom; Empire of Brazil; Riograndense Republic
- Branch/service: Portuguese Army; Imperial Brazilian Army; Riograndense Army
- Years of service: 1811–1844
- Battles/wars: First Banda Oriental Campaign; Second Banda Oriental Campaign; Cisplatine War; Ragamuffin War

Bento Gonçalves da Silva (23 September 1788 – 18 July 1847) was a Brazilian army officer, politician and rebel leader of the Riograndense Republic. He was the first President of the Riograndense Republic and, by all accounts, one of the most prominent figures in the history of Rio Grande do Sul.

Although a staunch monarchist, Gonçalves led the rebel forces in the Ragamuffin War. Radicals within the rebel ranks forced the rebellion to become republican, which Gonçalves opposed. Still, even though he fought against the Empire of Brazil, Gonçalves and his troops celebrated the birthday of the young emperor Pedro II of Brazil. After the conflict ended with the victory of the Empire, Gonçalves paid his respect to Pedro II by kissing his hand during the latter's trip to Rio Grande do Sul in December 1845.

His main companions in arms during the rebellion were Antônio de Sousa Neto and Giuseppe Garibaldi.

== Bibliography ==
- Rodrigues, Alfredo Ferreira (1990). Vultos e fatos da Revolução Farroupilha (in Portuguese). Brasília: Imprensa Nacional.
- Hüttner, Edison (2020). A Foto de Bento Gonçalves da Silva: Daguerreótipos e Farroupilhas (PDF) (in Portuguese). Porto Alegre: UBE RS.
