= Battle of Álvarez Field =

1852 battle of the Platine War

- Part of the Platine War
- Monument dedicated to those who fell in the battles of 1829 and 1852
Date	31 January 1852
Location	Álvarez field, Argentina 34°37′59″S 58°51′3″W
Result	Allied victory

Belligerents
Entre Ríos; Santa Fe; Empire of Brazil	Argentine Confederation

Commanders and leaders
Juan Pablo López; Miguel Galarza	Hilario Lagos

Strength
5,000 men	6,000 men

Casualties and losses
Unknown	200 killed 220 captured

The Battle of Álvarez Field was fought amidst the Platine War, where a force from the Argentine Confederation was defeated by the Ejército Grande on their way to the Argentine capital, Buenos Aires.

The battle happened after the Crossing of the Paraná River by the rebel forces, after which circa 2,000 men from Santa Fe joined them. In the battle, the Argentine cavalry was routed by the allied cavalry, but the former managed to escape.

== Engagement and aftermath ==
In late January 1852, the Ejército Grande's forces were in pursuit of those of the Argentine Confederation, on a trajectory aimed towards Buenos Aires, the country's capital. On January 31, the allied forces were raising their encampment near the Álvarez Fields, a plain named after the owner of the only farm in the region, a man named Álvarez. There were no fences or structures to serve as obstacles.

As they were raising camp, their cavalry saw a strong body of enemy cavalry; when General Urquiza was informed, he had colonels Juan Pablo López and Miguel Galarza attack them with their own horsemen, which they did through two separate but simultaneous flanking attacks. These had devastating effects and soon the Confederation's troops were in retreat. They would have lost 200 men killed during the engagement.

Bormann, a Brazilian marshal and historian, claims this battle was little more than a skirmish, trumped up in order to contain desertions in the allied camp.

A monument, dedicated to those who fell in the battles of 1829, under Lavalle, and 1852, under Urquiza, was inaugurated in 1934.
