= Brummer =

Brummer may refer to:

== People ==
- Brummer (surname)
- Brummer Badenhorst (born 1990), South African rugby union player

== Ships ==
- Brummer class cruiser, a class of two Imperial German Navy light mine-laying cruisers of World War I
  - SMS Brummer, lead ship of the class
- German training ship Brummer, a German World War II ship
- HNoMS Olav Tryggvason, a Royal Norwegian Navy ship captured by the Germans in World War II and renamed Brummer

== Others ==
- Rote Brummer nickname of the Uerdingen railbus
- Brummer, a mercenary unit of the Empire of Brazil created to fight in the Platine War

== See also ==
- Brumer (disambiguation)
- Brümmer
