= Brazilian frigate Dom Afonso =

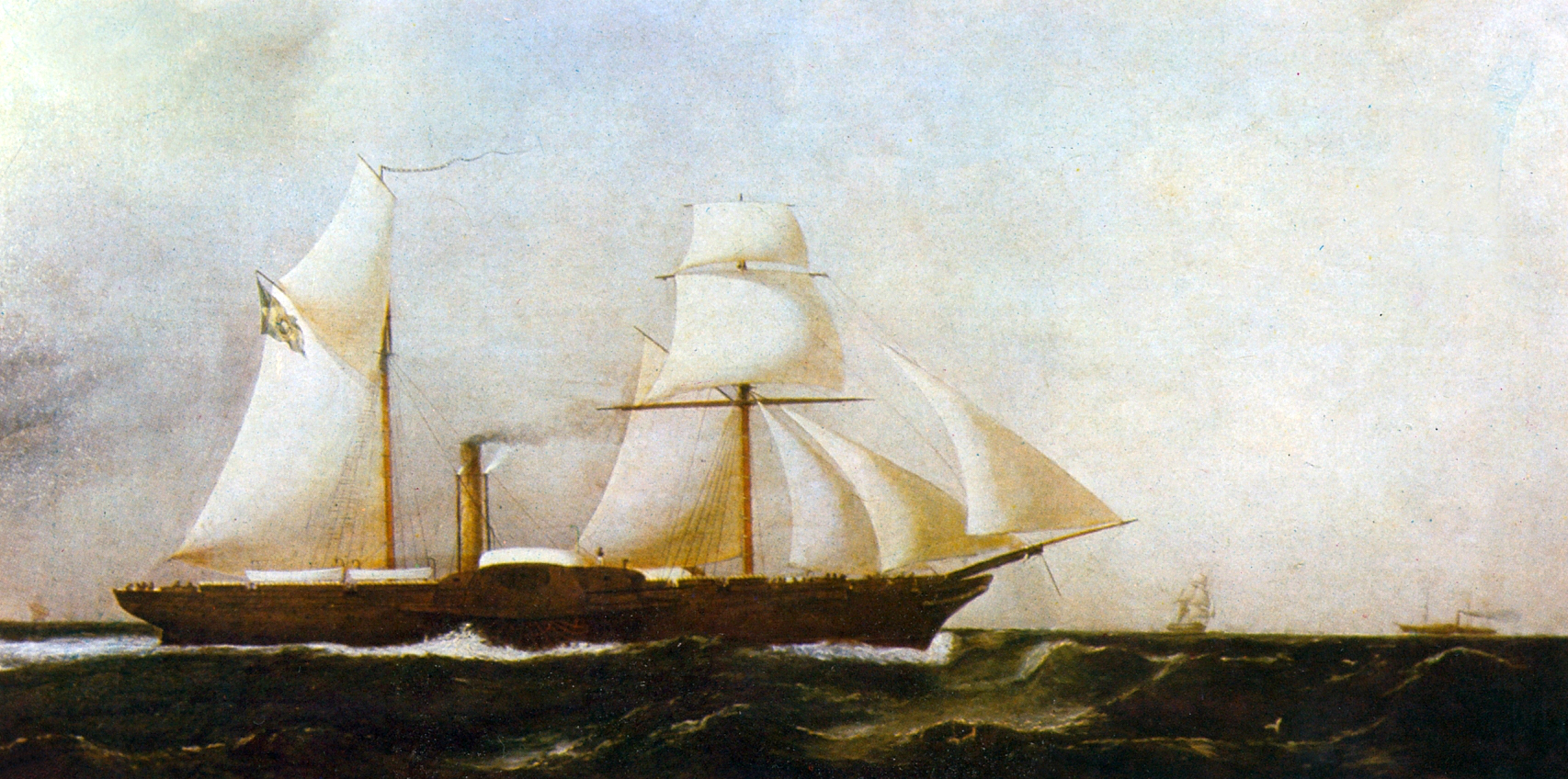
- Dom Afonso frigate, c. 1850

History

Empire of Brazil
- Name: Dom Afonso
- Namesake: Afonso, Prince Imperial of Brazil
- Builder: Thomas Royden & Sons
- Laid down: 25 March 1847
- Launched: 23 December 1847
- Fate: Sunk

General characteristics
- Type: Paddle frigate
- Displacement: 900 metric tons (890 long tons)
- Length: 60 m (196 ft 10 in)
- Beam: 9.45 m (31 ft 0 in)
- Draft: 3.66 m (12.0 ft)
- Depth: 6.10 m (20.0 ft)
- Installed power: 300 ihp (220 kW)
- Propulsion: Mixed steam-sail
- Armament: 2 × smoothbore 68-pounder guns; 4 × smoothbore 32-pounder guns

Dom Afonso was a steam frigate that served the Imperial Brazilian Navy, being the first steamship to serve in this navy. It was built in England under the supervision of chief of squad John Pascoe Grenfell and was named Dom Afonso in honor of Afonso, Prince Imperial of Brazil, son of emperor Pedro II of Brazil and empress Teresa Cristina.

Its first commander was then frigate captain Joaquim Marques Lisboa. The frigate participated in the rescue of the American vessel Ocean Monarch and the Portuguese vessel Vasco da Gama. It also took part in the repression of republican revolutionaries and clandestine slave traders off the coast of Brazil. The ship was part of the squadron that successfully forced the Tonelero pass in 1851 in Argentina, during the Platine War. On 9 January 1853, during a storm, it sank northwest of Cabo Frio, killing three sailors.

== Characteristics ==
Dom Afonso was 60m long; its beam was 9.45m wide and measured 6.10m in depth; it displaced 900t in weight and had a draft of 3.66m. Its propulsion system consisted of a pair of paddle wheels, mounted on each side, masts and four boilers that generated 300 hp of power. This meant that the ship could sail safely in the absence of wind or coal or use both wind and steam propulsion. Its hull was built with quality wood, with the bottom of the hull lined with thick copper and with a frame made of oak covered in bronze and copper. Its artillery consisted of two 68 caliber howitzers and four 32 caliber culverins. The crew consisted of 190 to 240 men, depending on the occasion. It was considered by the Brazilian navy its first steamship proper, at the time an innovation.

== Construction ==
The frigate was built at the Thomas Royden & Sons shipyard in Liverpool, England, based on the design of the British ship HMS Fury. Its boilers and condensators were built by B. Hick & Son in Bolton. The construction of the ship was under the supervision of English officer John Pascoe Grenfell, at the time consul of Brazil in Britain, who demanded a payment of 5% of the ship's total construction cost. His request was granted by the Brazilian government. Dom Afonso was named on 25 March 1847, in homage to the imperial prince Afonso Pedro, firstborn of emperor Pedro II and his wife Teresa Cristina. It was launched into the sea on December 23 of that same year and joined the navy in 1848.

== Career ==
=== Rescue of the Ocean Monarch ===
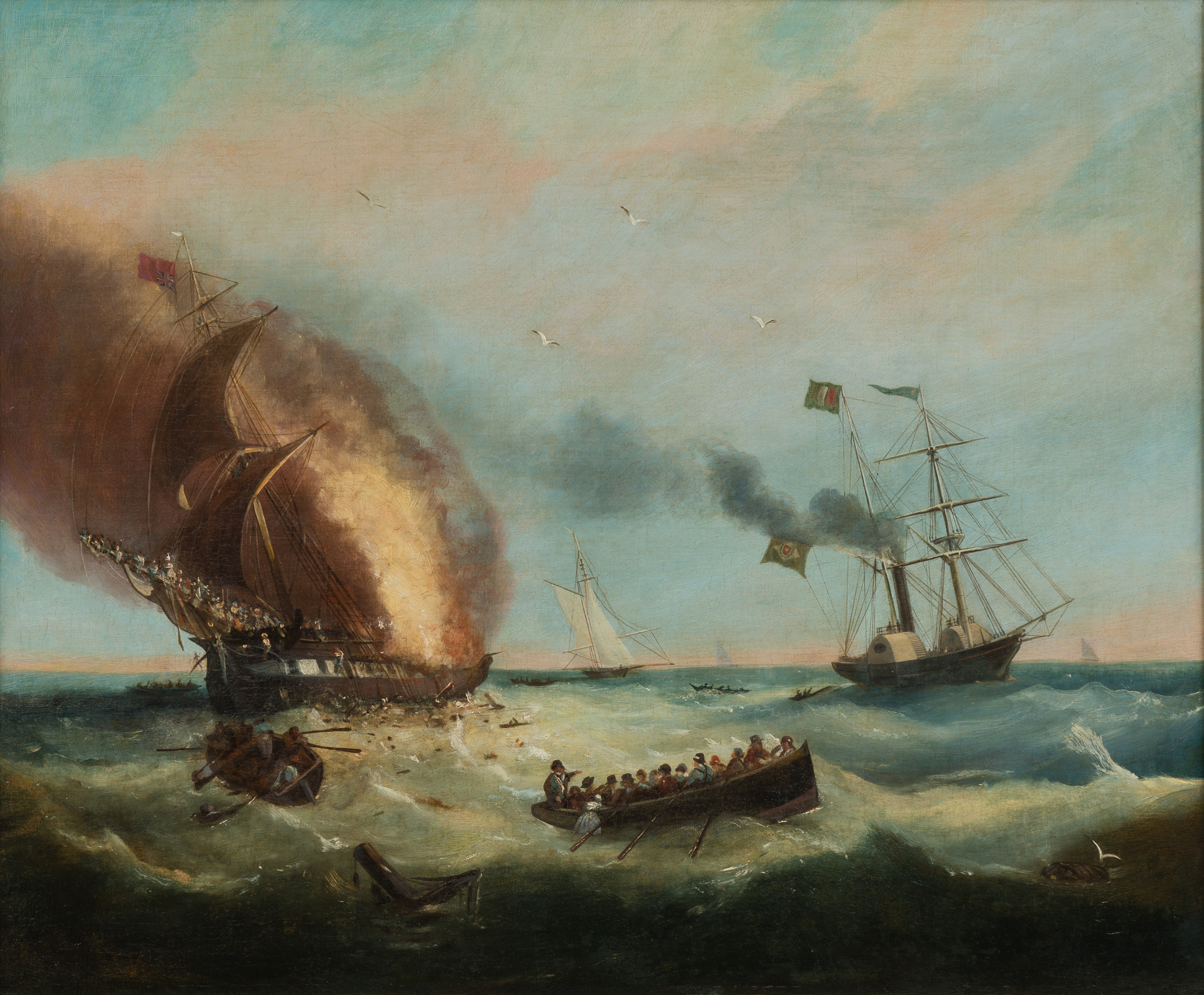
The Dom Afonso rescuing the passengers of the Ocean Monarch

Dom Afonso's first commander was the then frigate captain Joaquim Marques Lisboa, future Marquis of Tamandaré and patron of the Brazilian Navy. On 24 August 1848, the ship set sail from the port of Liverpool for the last sea trials and then continued on to Brazil. Among the passengers were princess Francisca, sister of Pedro II, and her husband, François d'Orléans, the Prince of Joinville, son of French king Louis Philippe I; Henri d'Orléans, the Duke of Aumale, his wife, princess Maria Carolina of Bourbon-Two Sicilies and chief of squad of the Imperial Brazilian Navy John Pascoe Grenfell. It was on this trip that a sailor from Dom Afonso saw a ship on fire, sounding the alarm shortly thereafter. It was around eleven o'clock in the morning that the crew began the rescue of the American ship Ocean Monarch, which was carrying 396 people, English immigrants who were bound for the city of Boston.

Commander Marques Lisboa immediately ordered the rescue of the survivors, sending lifeboats to the burning ship. The crew, despite immense difficulties, managed to rescue 156 people who were still on the vessel and another 60 who had thrown themselves overboard. For this act of bravery, the Brazilian sailors were rewarded with one hundred pounds to be distributed among them by the emperor. However, given the difficult situation the survivors were in, the entire amount was donated to them. Commander Marques Lisboa received a gold chronometer with the inscription "Presented by the British Government [to the commander] of the steam-frigate of the Brazilian Imperial Navy, in testimony of their admiration of the gallantry and humanity displayed by him in rescuing manny British subjects from the burning wreck of the ship OCEAN MONARCH. August, 1848" as a form of gratitude.

=== Praieira revolt ===
On 1 February 1849, Dom Afonso arrived in Brazil, anchoring in Recife. At this time, it was discovered that a revolt was underway, which would later be known as the Praieira Revolution. The next day, the frigate took up a position against the rebels who were marching on the city, leading a squadron of ships that landed troops, including the ship's crew, with the aim of defeating the rebels. During the combat, the Brazilian commander came across a firing squad prepared to execute two rebels. He intervened on behalf of the latter, taking them aboard the ship.

=== Rescue of the Vasco da Gama ===
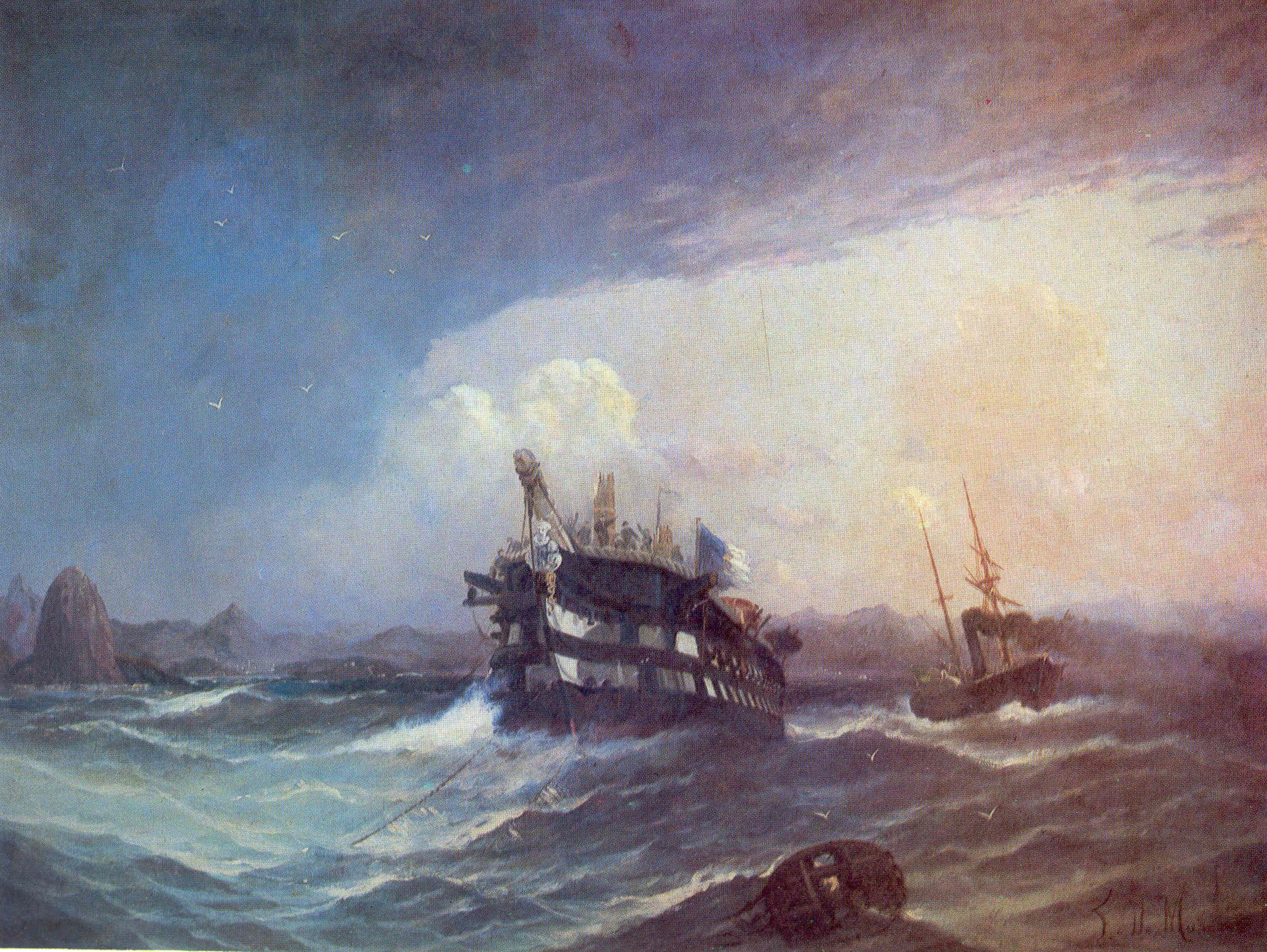
The rescue of the Vasco da Gama

On 28 February 1849, the Dom Afonso docked in Rio de Janeiro. At dawn on May 5, there was a violent storm on the coast of Rio de Janeiro which hit the Portuguese ship Vasco da Gama. Due to the storm, the ship had lost its masts, adrift, and in danger off the coast. The captain of sea and war Joaquim Marques Lisboa, still in command of Dom Afonso, set out to help the ship, overcoming large waves that were forming. After several attempts, Dom Afonso managed to extend a tow line, safely bringing the Portuguese ship to Guanabara Bay, without losing a single crew member.

In gratitude for the rescue, members of a Portuguese colony in Rio de Janeiro organized themselves and presented Marques Lisboa with a golden sword. The Portuguese government awarded him the Military Order of the Tower and Sword, conferred by queen Maria II. By the notice of the Brazilian Navy of 6 June 1849, the command of Dom Afonso was handed over to the captain of sea and war Jesuíno Lamego da Costa, future Baron of Laguna. He commanded the frigate in the Platine War during the passage of Tonelero in 1851.

=== Passage of Tonelero ===
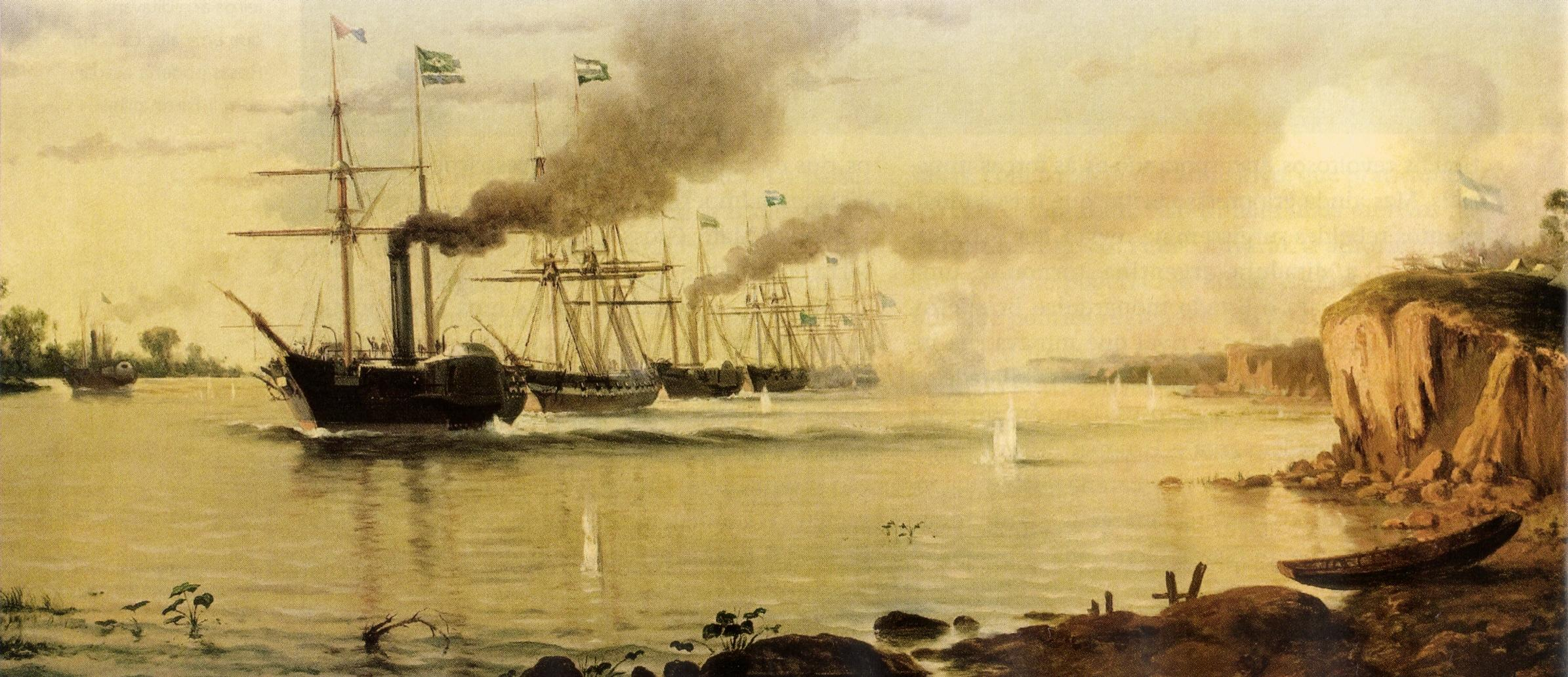
The Brazilian fleet forcing the passage of Tonelero

Shortly after the surrender of Manuel Oribe in Uruguay, the allied army consisting of Uruguayan troops, Argentine infantry and artillery commanded by Justo José de Urquiza and the 1st Brazilian division commanded by brigadier Manuel Marques de Sousa, future Count of Porto Alegre, gathered in Colonia del Sacramento, in the south of Uruguay and opposite to Buenos Aires. On 17 December 1851, the Brazilian fleet, commanded by Grenfell, was near the ravines of Acevedo, on the Paraná River, with the intention of breaking through the Argentine defenses at the Tonelero pass. There were eight Brazilian warships: four steam corvettes, Dom Afonso, Dom Pedro, Dom Pedro II and Recife, which towed two sailing corvettes, Dona Francisca and União, in addition to a brig, Calíope. On board Grenfell's flagship Dom Afonso were brigadier general Manuel Marques de Sousa, Argentine colonel Wenceslao Paunero, lieutenant colonel Bartolomé Mitre and lieutenant colonel Domingo Faustino Sarmiento. In this passage, Dom Afonso demonstrated its strength in front of the city of Buenos Aires.

Against the Brazilian fleet there were 16 guns manned by two battalions and an artillery squadron and by the 6th Carabineros Regiment, which together amounted to about 2,000 Argentine soldiers, under the command of Lucio Norberto Mansilla. For an hour, the Argentines fired more than 450 bombs at the Brazilian ships, causing little damage but killing four sailors and injuring five others. The warships counterattacked, without causing much damage to the Argentine forces, killing eight soldiers and wounding twenty. On 17 January 1852, Dom Afonso, with Luís Alves de Lima e Silva on board, advanced on the port of Buenos Aires, finishing this attack intact.

=== Final years ===
On 20 September 1852 Dom Afonso left for Maranhão in order to undergo cleaning and repairs, being commanded on that occasion by captain lieutenant José Antônio de Siqueira, reaching its destination on November 4. After that the ship returned to Rio de Janeiro. On 8 January 1853, the frigate set sail in order to carry out an operation to repress illegal slave trade. On the January 9, during its mission, the ship was close to Massambaba beach, seven miles off the coast, which was between Ponta do Francês and Ponta da Salina, northwest of Cabo Frio, in the province of Rio de Janeiro. On that day, there was a violent storm that hit Dom Afonso, causing it to sink, leading to the death of second lieutenant Antônio Francisco Araújo and two soldiers of the crew. An investigation was opened against the ship's officers. In this, the commander of the ship, captain lieutenant José Antônio de Siqueira and first lieutenants Cândido de Lemos and Antônio Manuel Fernandes, officers of the watch, were each sentenced to one year in prison and one year without any command in the navy.

== See also ==
- List of historical ships of the Brazilian Navy
