= Brummer (surname) =

Brummer is a surname. Notable people with the surname include:

- Alex Brummer (born 1949), British journalist, editor, and author
- Carl Harald Brummer (1864–1953), Danish architect
- Clemens Brummer (born 1986), German figure skater
- Dieter Brummer (1976–2021), Australian actor
- Glenn Brummer (born 1954), American baseball player
- Joseph Brummer (1883–1947), Hungarian-born art dealer and collector
- Richard H. Brummer (born 1942), American politician and judge

== See also ==
- Brümmer
