= Brazilian corvette Pedro II =

19th century Brazilian warship

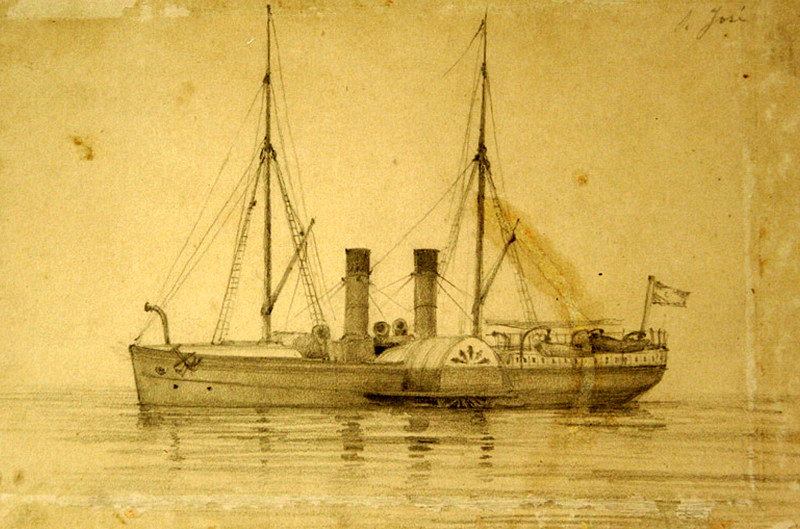

History

Empire of Brazil
- Name: Pedro II
- Namesake: Pedro II of Brazil
- Builder: Ponta da Areia Shipyard
- Launched: 13 May 1850
- Commissioned: 22 February 1851
- Decommissioned: 26 October 1861
- Fate: Sunk

General characteristics
- Type: Paddle corvette
- Displacement: 900 metric tons (890 long tons)
- Length: 54.55 m (179 ft 0 in)
- Beam: 8.22 m (27 ft 0 in)
- Depth: 5.18 m (17.0 ft)
- Installed power: 220 ihp (160 kW)
- Propulsion: Steam
- Armament: 2 × smoothbore 68-pounder guns; 4 × smoothbore 32-pounder guns

Pedro II was a steam corvette warship that served in the Imperial Brazilian Navy in the second half of the 19th century. It took part in the Platine War.

== Construction ==
The corvette was built at the Ponta da Areia Foundry and Shipyard Establishment in Niterói in 1850, being one of the first ships built in this shipyard. It received the name Pedro II in honor of the second emperor of Brazil Pedro de Alcântara. After being launched into the sea in 1850 and undergoing armament tests in 1851, it was incorporated into the Brazilian fleet on 22 February 1851, with its first commander being captain-lieutenant Francisco Xavier de Alcântara. In that same year, it was sent south to participate in Brazilian operations in the conflict known as the Platine War against the Argentine Confederation.

== Service ==
=== Platine War ===
On 17 December 1851, the corvette Pedro II, with six warships under the command of John Pascoe Grenfell, forced its way through the obstacles opposing navigation on the Paraná River where, in the Tonelero pass, near the Acevedo ravine, a fortification with 16 pieces of artillery and 2,000 Argentine marines had been installed, under the command of Lucio Norberto Mansilla. Argentine troops exchanged fire with the Brazilian warships, but could not prevent their passage.

=== Final years ===
After the conflict, the ship was part of the Pernambuco Naval Station between 1859 and 1861. Still in 1861, it sunk near the Punta Brava Lighthouse in Montevideo, Uruguay.

== See also ==
- List of historical ships of the Brazilian Navy
