= Great Army =

Great Army may refer to:

- Grande Armée, army commanded by Napoleon during the Napoleonic Wars in the 19th century
- Great Heathen Army, coalition of Norse warriors that originated from Sweden, Norway, and Denmark in the 9th century
- Ejército Grande, an Argentine coalition army under the command of Justo José de Urquiza in 1852
