= Brumer =

Brumer may refer to:

== People ==
- Alon Brumer (born 1973), a former Israeli professional footballer (twin brother of Gadi Brumer)
- Gadi Brumer (born 1973), a former Israeli professional footballer (twin brother of Alon Brumer)

== Other ==
- Brumer bound, a bound for the rank of an elliptic curve, proved by Armand Brumer
- Brumer–Stark conjecture, a conjecture in algebraic number theory, named after Armand Brumer and Harold Stark
- Brumer Islands, an island group of Papua New Guinea

== See also ==
- Brummer (disambiguation)
