= Battle of the Tonelero Pass =

Battle during the Platine War

The Passage of the Tonelero
- Part of the Platine War
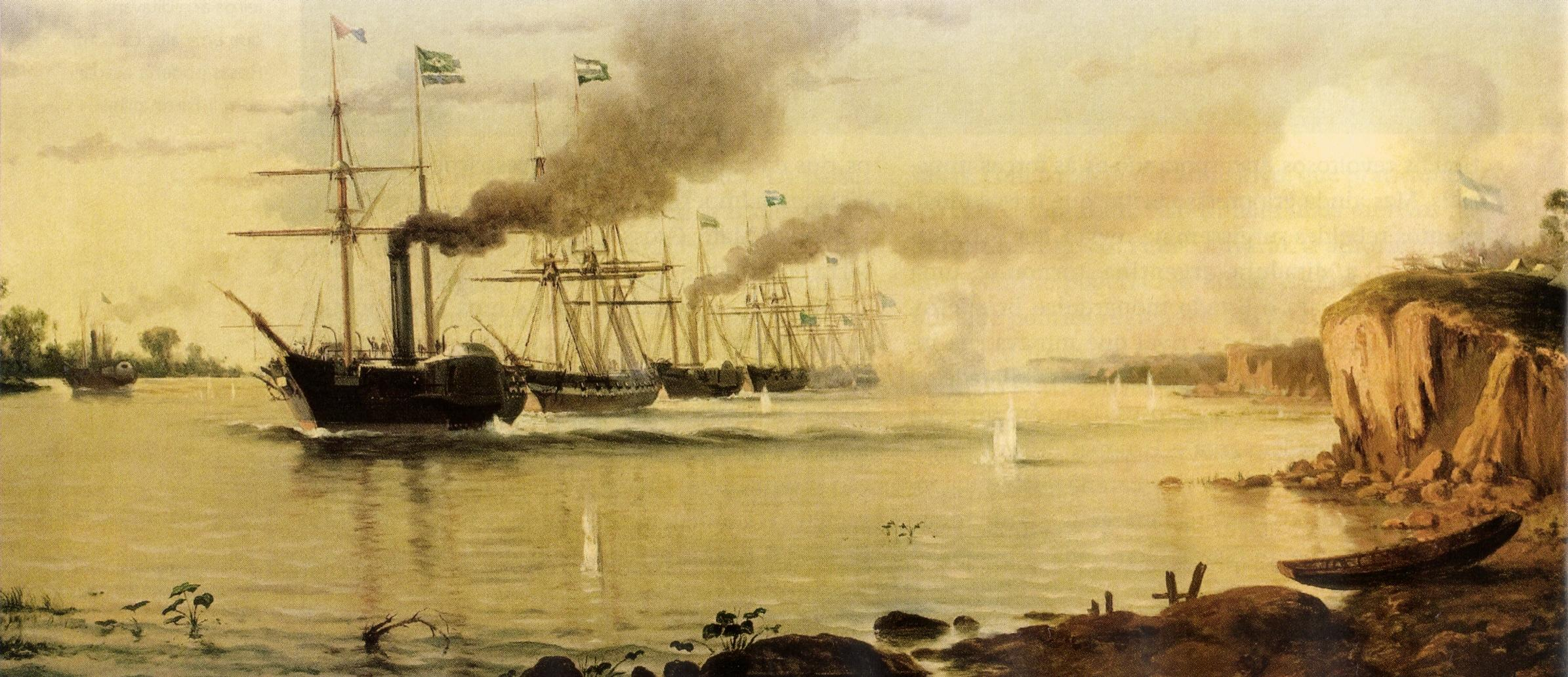
Date	17 December 1851
Location	Paraná River, Argentina 33°26′01″S 60°03′28″W
Result	Brazilian victory

Belligerents
Empire of Brazil	Argentine Confederation

Commanders and leaders
(Empire of Brazil) John Pascoe Grenfell	(Argentine Confederation) Lucio N. Mansilla

Strength
4 steamships 3 corvettes 1 brig 60 guns	2,000; 16 guns

Casualties and losses
4 killed 5 wounded Corvette Dona Francisca hit by 3 cannon balls Steamship Recife heavily damaged Steamship Dom Afonso damaged Brig Caliope heavily damaged	Brazilian accounts: 8 killed 20 wounded Argentine accounts: 1 killed

The Battle of the Tonelero Pass, also known as Passage of the Tonelero, was a battle in the Platine War fought near the cliff of Acevedo, in the west bank of the Paraná River, Argentina, on 17 December 1851, between the Argentine Confederation Army commanded by Lucio Norberto Mansilla and warships of the Brazilian Imperial Navy led by John Pascoe Grenfell.

That day the Brazilian fleet commanded by Grenfell was near the cliff of Acevedo in the river Paraná, with the intention to break through the Argentine defenses at the Tonelero pass. There were eight Brazilian warships: four steam corvettes, Dom Pedro, Dom Pedro II, Dom Afonso and Recife, that towed two sailing corvettes, Dona Francisca and União, plus a brig, Calíope. On board Grenfell's flagship, Dom Afonso, were Brigadier General Marques de Sousa and the Argentines Colonel Wenceslao Paunero, Lieutenant-Colonel Bartolomé Mitre and Lieutenant-Colonel Domingo Faustino Sarmiento. The ships ferried half of the troops that composed the 1st Division of Imperial Infantry. The rest of the division was waiting at Colonia del Sacramento, Uruguay.

To oppose the passage, there were 16 artillery pieces and 2,000 soldiers commanded by Lucio Norberto Mansilla, son-in-law of the leader of the Argentine Confederation, Juan Manuel de Rosas. For one hour the Argentines fired more than 450 cannon rounds in the direction of the Brazilian ships, causing little damage to the warships, but killing four sailors and wounding another five. The warships fired back, although they failed to cause any major damage to the Argentine forces, only killing eight and wounding twenty. Other sources say that the Argentine artillery caused heavy damage to the warships.

The squadron landed the troops at Diamante, Entre Ríos and part of the ships returned to bring the other battalions that stayed behind in Colonia.

Mansilla believed that the Brazilian division was going to land right on his main position. He fled along with his men, leaving all the artillery and other equipment behind.

== See also ==
- Battle of Caseros
- Platine War
