= Crossing of the Paraná River =

- Part of the Platine War
- El gran cruce del Río Paraná, 1895 painting by Emilio Caraffa
| Date | 23 December 1851 – 6 January 1852 |
| Location | Paraná River, Santa Fe, Argentina |
| Result | Allied victory: Adhesion of Santa Fe to the allied cause |

Belligerents
| Entre Ríos; Santa Fe; Empire of Brazil | Argentine Confederation |

Commanders and leaders
| Justo José de Urquiza; John Pascoe Grenfell; Domingo Crespo; Juan Pablo López | Ángel Pacheco; Pascual Echagüe; Lucio Norberto Mansilla |

The Crossing of the Paraná River was an event of the Platine War, where troops belonging to rebel leader Justo José de Urquiza, on board of Brazilian ships under Admiral John Pascoe Grenfell crossed the Paraná River between late 1851 and early 1852. This allowed them both to contact their new allies in Santa Fe, and march towards Buenos Aires.

== The crossing ==
Between 23 December 1851 and 6 January 1852 Justo José de Urquiza's army crossed the Paraná River, in what was a huge military operation for the continent and time, entering Santa Fe.

When Santa Fe's governor, Pascual Echagüe, was made aware of the impending rebel crossing, he marched south to raise troops in order to fight the invaders, and also to get in touch with Brigadier Ángel Pacheco, whose division of troops was based in San Nicolás de los Arroyos, which bordered the province. Santa Fe's troops rose up against them, however; in 23 December a rising was made in the city of Santa Fe, and, with the aid of the provincial militias and the advance troops of the rebel army, it managed to ovethrow the Buenos Aires-aligned authorities, with Domingo Crespo, a local landowner, being appointed provisional governor. On 25 December, the militia raised in Rosario by Lucio Norberto Mansilla, who was loyal to Rosas in Buenos Aires, rose up and joined Urquiza. With this, the loyalist officers had to withdraw from the province.

Santa Fe was taken with little fighting. Urquiza was acclaimed by the local population and met with the new governor at Capitán Bermúdez. The provincial militias, around 2,000 men strong, joined his army, under Juan Pablo López' command.
