= Brümmer =

Brümmer or Bruemmer is a surname. Notable people with the name include:

- Fred Bruemmer (1929–2013), Latvian-Canadian nature photographer and researcher
- Günter Brümmer (1933–2020), German slalom canoeist
- Gustav Bruemmer (1905–1970), German watchmaker
- Jürgen Brümmer (1964–2014), German gymnast and physical therapist
- Kai Luke Brümmer (born 1993), South African actor
- Renate Brümmer (born 1955), German meteorologist and astronaut
- Vincent Brümmer (1932–2021), South African theologian

== See also ==
- Brummer (disambiguation)
