= Mestre bound =

Bound in mathematics

In mathematics, the Mestre bound is a bound on the analytic rank of an elliptic curve in terms of its conductor, introduced by Mestre (1986).

== See also ==
- Brumer bound
