= Gustav Bruemmer =

German watchmaker (1905–1970)

Gustav Bruemmer (or Brümmer; April 23, 1905 – July 4, 1970) was a German watchmaker and headmaster at the watchmaking school in Hamburg.

== Biography ==
Bruemmer was born on April 23, 1905, in Kiel. He left school in 1920, having acquired the O-level qualification. He learned the craft of watchmaking in Glashütte and took the trade test in 1924. His test work is now exhibited in the Museum of the School of Watchmaking in Glashuette. From 1927 to 1929, he attended the German School of Watchmaking Bruemmer Glashuette. He studied at the Vocational Teacher Training Institute and the Graduate School of Berlin. From 1931 to 1933, he trained as a commercial teacher. In his thesis he wrote about "Vocational education in watchmaking." In 1933, he had a practical educational year at the trade school in Lokstedt-Niendorf. In 1934, he took on various teaching assignments in Hamburg and married his wife Gertrude in the same year. From 1 April 1936, he was a fully employed teacher at the vocational school in Lokstedt-Niendorf. The monthly salary amount was then 236.37 Reichsmark. In 1940, he started as a teacher in the state sector School of Watchmaking Altona, Hamburg. In 1944, he became a commercial senior teacher at the same school. Since that time, he wrote many technical articles for the journal "The Clock" (organ of the Central Association of the Watchmaker). In 1952, he published the still-used book "Applied Mathematics for Watchmakers" as the third edition of the textbook series "The Watchmaking School" of the publisher Hermann Brinkmann with the cooperation of the State School of Watchmaking in Altona and the "Central Association of the Watchmaker". In 1958, he was technical director at the state school for watchmakers in Hamburg-Altona, until he retired in 1968. Bruemmer died of kidney failure many years after.

== Writings (selection) ==
Applied mathematics for watchmakers. William Knapp Verlag. 15 editions. ISBN 978-3874200127.
A look at the gear train. The clock, 1949, No.6, p.3
Half of vibrations, oscillations and vibrations double. The clock, 1949, No. 8, p.7
The module - a useful computational size. The clock, 1949, No.12, p.8
The counter ratchet, an auxiliary drive for watches. The clock, 1950, No.12, p.21
Of development and construction of the free escapement. The clock, 1951, No. 2, 4, 6, 8
Of structure and adjustment of the Graham escapement. The clock, 1951, No.18, 20 22,
Ferdinand Adolph Lange - founder of the Glashütte watchmaking. The clock, 1953, No.4, p.33
Of the unrest. The clock, 1954, No.22, p.34
Of the cylinder escapement. The clock, 1955, No.10, p.31
