= Richard H. Brummer =

American politician and judge (born 1942)

Richard H. Brummer (born June 5, 1942) is an American politician and judge.

Born in Effingham, Illinois, Brummer studied at the Institute of European Studies in Vienna, Austria. He received his bachelor's degree from Quincy College and his law degree from the University of Illinois College of Law. Brummer served in the Illinois House of Representatives from 1977 until 1985 and was a Democrat. In January 1985, Brummer resigned from the Illinois General Assembly when he was appointed to the Illinois Circuit Court.
