= John Pascoe Grenfell =

Navy officer and diplomat of the Empire of Brazil

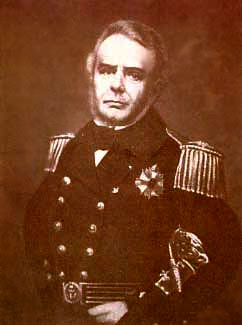
- Admiral John Pascoe Grenfell
- Born: 20 September 1800; Battersea, London, England, U.K.
- Died: 20 March 1869 (aged 68); Liverpool, Merseyside, England, U.K.
- Burial place: Père Lachaise Cemetery
- Military career
- Allegiance: Chile; Empire of Brazil
- Branch: Chilean Navy; Imperial Brazilian Navy
- Rank: Admiral
- Conflicts: Chilean War of Independence; Peruvian War of Independence; Brazilian War of Independence; Cisplatine War; Ragamuffin War; Platine War
- Other work: Diplomat

John Pascoe Grenfell (20 September 1800 – 20 March 1869) was an English naval officer of the Empire of Brazil. He spent most of his service in South America campaigns, initially under the leadership of Lord Cochrane and then Commodore Norton. He was the nephew of British politician Pascoe Grenfell and grandfather to General Sir John Grenfell Maxwell. In Brazil, he rose to the rank of admiral and for his achievements was made a knight grand cross of the Imperial Order of the Rose and a knight of the Imperial Order of the Southern Cross.

== Personal history ==
=== Early life ===
John Pascoe Grenfell was born in Battersea, Surrey on 20 September 1800 to John Maugham Grenfell and his wife Sophia Turner. In 1811 he entered the service of the British East India Company, and in 1819 he joined the Chilean Navy under Lord Cochrane. He took part in most of the conflicts undertaken by Lord Cochrane during the Chilean War of Independence, and rose to the rank of lieutenant. On 5 November 1820 Grenfell took part in the cutting out of the frigate Esmeralda and the following year in the pursuit of the Venganza and Prueba, the last major Spanish warships in the South Pacific. In 1823, he followed Lord Cochrane to Brazil, to fight in the Brazilian War of Independence.

In August 1823, Grenfell, now a Commander in the small brig Dom Miguel sailed to Belém do Pará and using a similar tactic used by Lord Cochrane at Maranhão, persuaded the Portuguese forces to surrender by making them think a larger fleet was in the offing. The Portuguese capitulated, but pro-Brazilian soldiers carried out large-scale protests and looting. In retaliation, Grenfell had five random imprisoned soldiers shot in the Largo do Palácio, a broad public square, on 17 October 1823. João Gonçalves Batista Campos, the new pro-Imperial president, was tied to the mouth of a cannon to extract a confession on the theft and looting; Batista Campos survived through the intervention of a friend. Grenfell is most noted for the "tragedy of the brig Palhaço", where 256 prisoners were detained in the hold of a prison vessel, the São José Diligente of the cost of the city; by the next morning there were only four survivors. Grenfell's direct orders are unknown, but news of the massacre solidified anti-Imperial sentiment across North Brazil.

During the war with Argentina in 1826, he commanded the brig Caboclo as part of the squadron blockading Buenos Aires under English Commodore James Norton. On 29 July, while engaged in a naval battle against the Argentine fleet, whose commander was admiral William Brown, he lost his right arm. He then returned to England to recuperate.

=== Later life ===
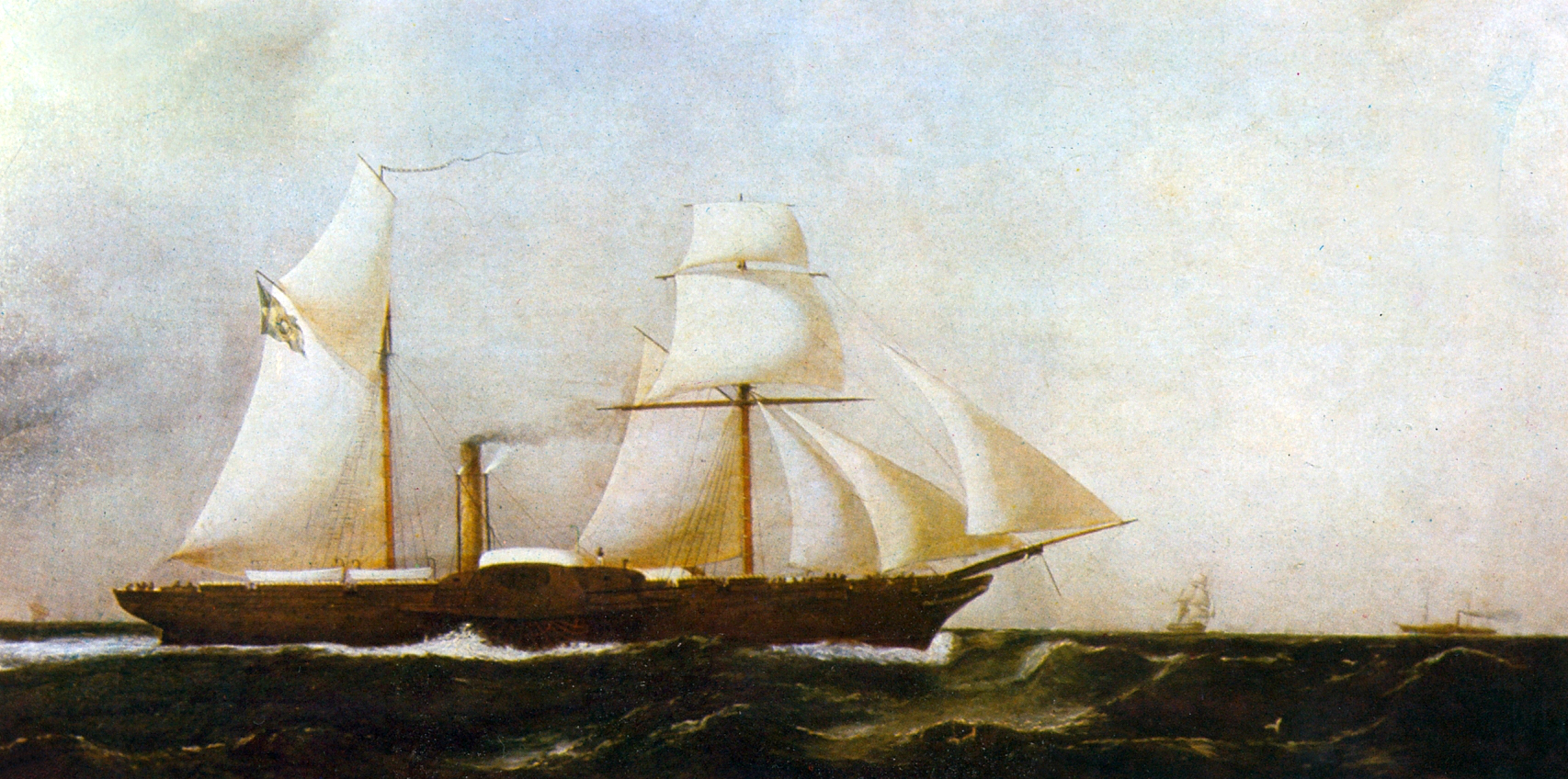
The steam frigate Dom Afonso

In 1828 Grenfell returned to Brazil, and from 1835–36, he commanded as Commodore a squadron of ships on the lakes of Rio Grande do Sul against the Farrapos rebels. He was successful in defeating his opponents and forcing the surrender of the insurgent forces. In 1841 he was promoted to rear-admiral and in 1846 was appointed Brazilian consul general in Liverpool. One of his principal tasks was to supervise the construction of the state-of-the-art steam frigate Dom Afonso, to the lines of HMS Fury. She was built by Thomas Royden And Co., of Liverpool with engines from Benjamin Hicks and Co., of Bolton. In 1848, when Dom Afonso was undergoing steam trials on the Mersey with Grenfell, the diplomatic corps and members of the Brazilian and French Royal families on board, the frigate rescued 160 passengers from the America bound immigrant ship Ocean Monarch which had caught fire one day out from Liverpool. The Brazilian government was so pleased with the performance of Dom Afonso that Grenfell was ordered to sign a contract for a second steam frigate called Amazonas.

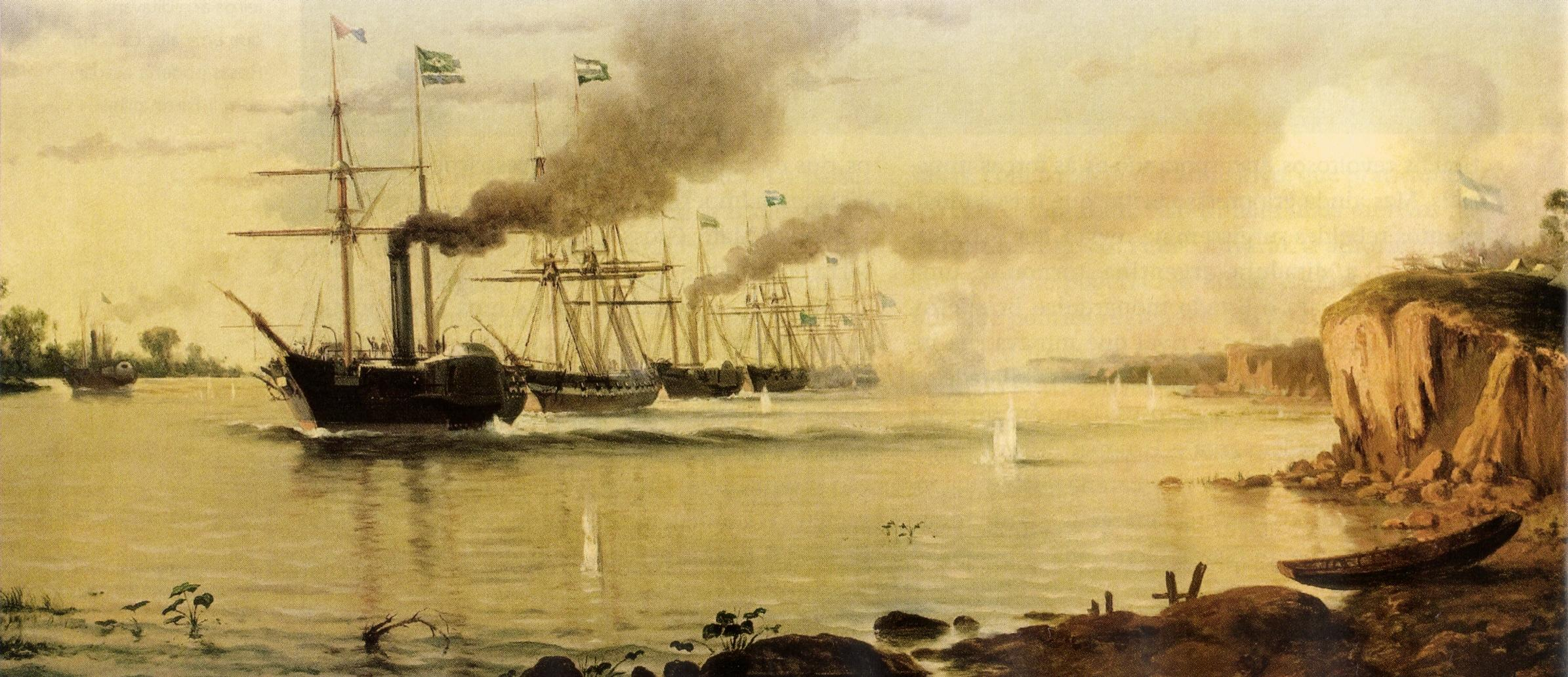
Brazilian warships passing through defences at The Tonelero.

In 1851, when war broke out between Brazil and Argentine dictator Rosas, Grenfell was posted back to Brazil to take command of their naval forces in the Río de la Plata. In December of that year at the Battle of Tonelero, with the Dom Afonso as his flagship, he successfully forced the passage of the Paraná River carrying a Brazilian army which combined with local forces to defeat Rosas. A grateful Brazilian Government recommended that he be made a Viscount, but the Emperor refused as Grenfell was not a Brazilian but had retained his British citizenship. He was however promoted to vice-admiral and then finally admiral and returned to Liverpool to resume his role as consul-general. In 1861, he attended the funeral of Lord Cochrane in Westminster Abbey as the representative of the Brazilian Government. He died in Paris in 1869.

=== Family ===
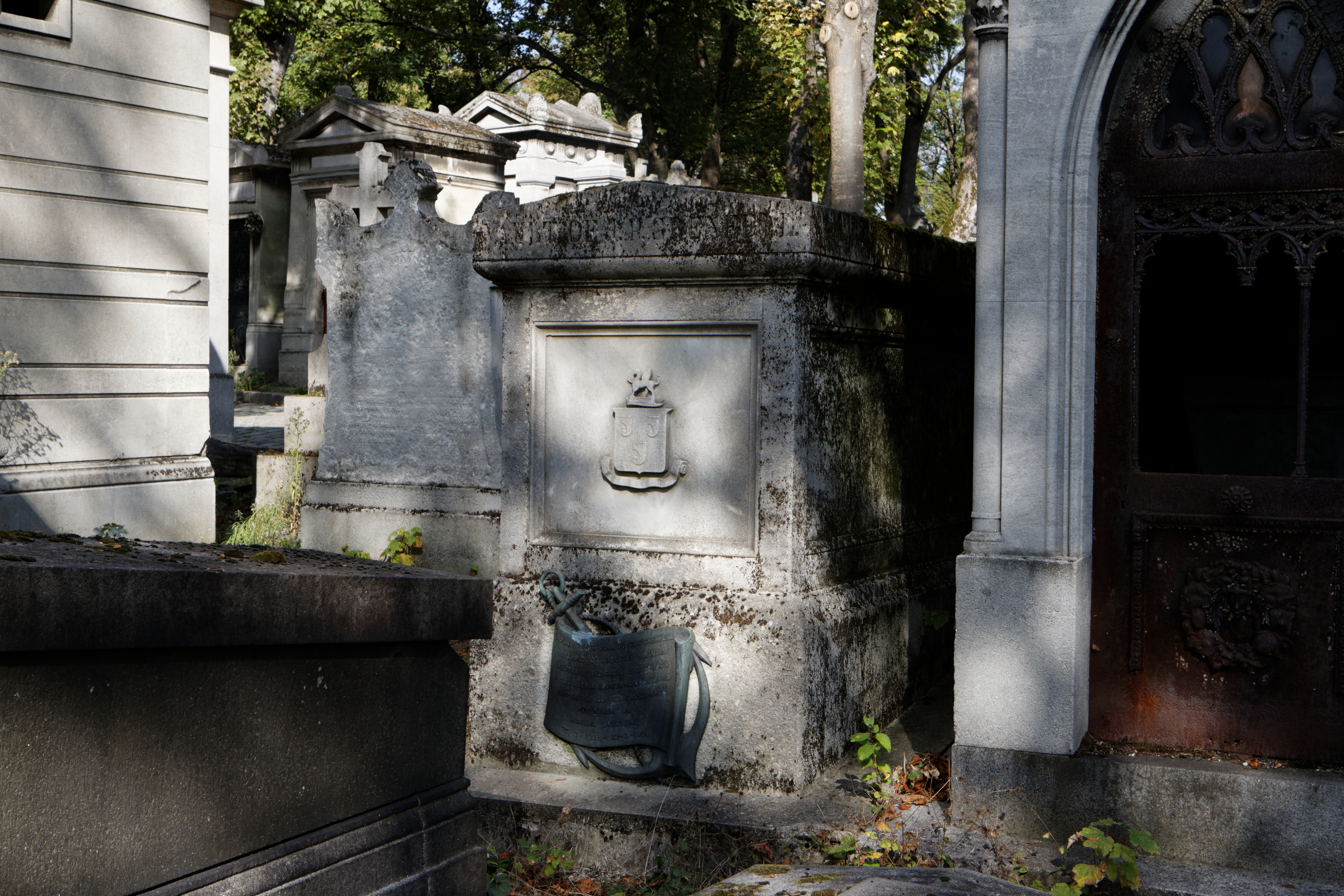
Père-Lachaise Cemetery

Grenfell married Maria Dolores Masini in Montevideo. They had eight children: John Granville (1829–1866), Maria Dolores (1831–?), Sophia (1833–1898), Maria Emma (1833–?), Alfred (1839–?), Flora (1841–1874), Harry Tremenheere (1845–1906) and Thomas Cochrane (1847–49).

== Honors ==
=== Non-titled nobility honors ===
- Grand Cross of Brazilian Order of the Rose.
- Officer of the Brazilian Order of the Southern Cross.

=== Military honors ===
- Medal (oval) of the Independence War (Bahia).
- Medal (gold; blue ribbon) for the Battle of The Tonelero Passage.

== Bibliography ==
- Haring, Carlos Guilherme (1869). Almanak Administrativo, Mercantil e Industrial (Almanaque Laemmert) (in Portuguese). Rio de Janeiro, Rio de Janeiro: Eduardo & Henrique Laemmert.
- Mark Harris (2010). Rebellion on the Amazon: the Cabanagem, race, and popular culture in the north of Brazil, 1798-1840. New York City: Cambridge University Press. pp. 186–187. ISBN 978-0-521-43723-3. LCCN 2010021221. OCLC 610830927. OL 24553389M. Wikidata Q118369354.
- Morais, Eugênio Vilhena (2003). O Duque de Ferro: novos aspectos da figura de Caxias (in Portuguese). Rio de Janeiro, Rio de Janeiro: Biblioteca do Exército. ISBN 978-85-7011-329-0.
- Rodrigues, José Honório (1975). Independência: revolução e contra-revolução (in Portuguese). Vol. 3. Rio de Janeiro, Rio de Janeiro: Livraria Francisco Alves Editora.
- Vale, Brian Cochrane in the Pacific: Fortune and Freedom in Spanish America, London, I B Tauris, 2008
- Vale, Brian Independence or Death! British Sailors and Brazilian Independence, London, I B Tauris, 1996
- Vale, Brian A War Betwixt Englishmen: Brazil against Argentina in the River Plate 1825-30, London, I B Tauris, 2000
- Vale, Brian, 'Captain J P Grenfell of the Brazilian Navy in the River Plate', in The Naval Miscellany VIII, Navy Records Society, 2017
