= Brumer bound =

Bound for the rank of an elliptic curve

In mathematics, the Brumer bound is a bound for the rank of an elliptic curve, proved by Brumer (1992).

== See also ==
- Mestre bound
