= Ejército Grande =

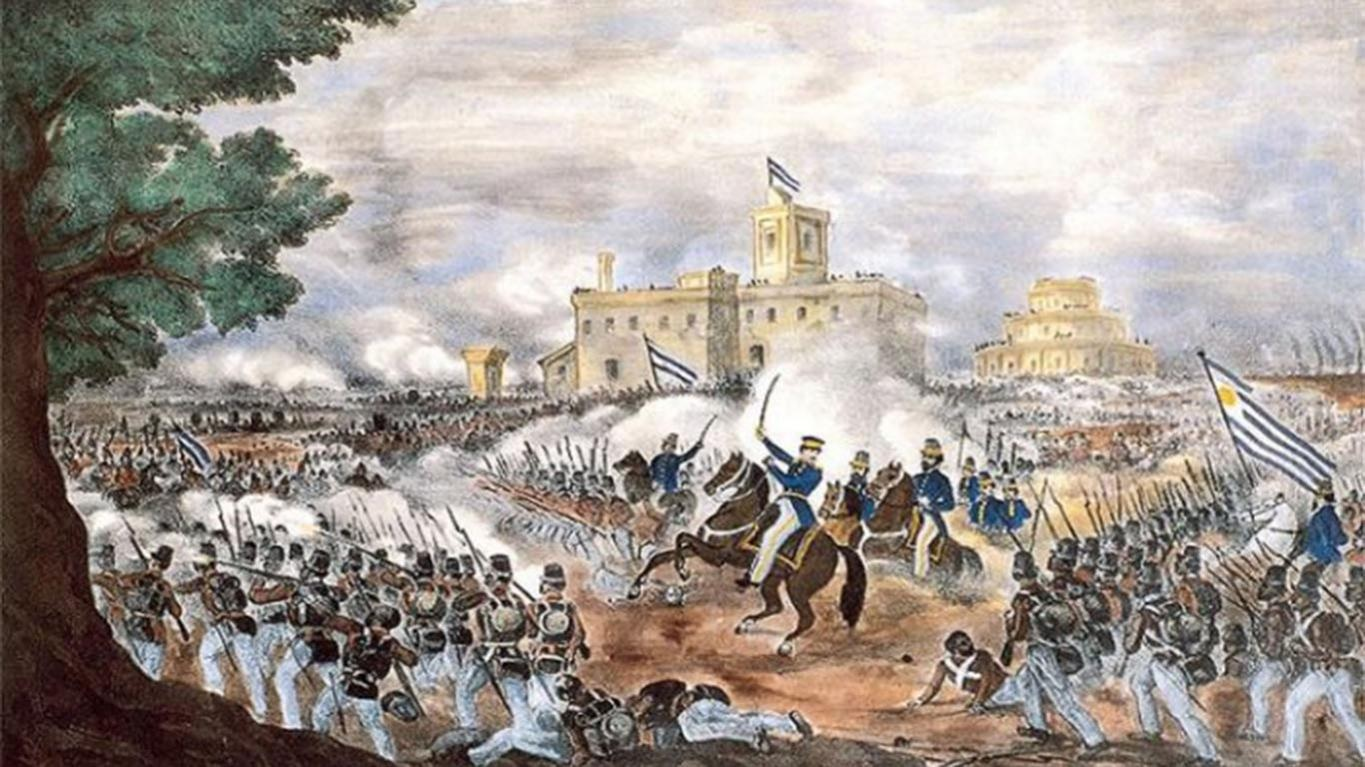
Portrait of the Battle of Caseros, fought by the Ejército Grande

The so-called Ejército Grande (English: Grand Army), also called the Ejército Grande Aliado Libertador (English: Grand Allied Liberating Army), was the coalition army that in 1852, under the command of the governor of Entre Ríos, Justo José de Urquiza, invaded the provinces of Santa Fe and Buenos Aires and defeated Juan Manuel de Rosas's army, which until that moment was in command of the foreign relations of the Argentine Confederation.

Consisting of about 24,000 men, the majority from the provinces of Entre Ríos and Corrientes, also including 4,000 Brazilians, who were the only professional soldiers, and some 1,600 Uruguayans. There were also some divisions commanded by porteño officers, future notable figures of the Argentine political scene, such as future presidents Bartolomé Mitre and Domingo Faustino Sarmiento. The army had 50 artillery pieces. While marching through Santa Fe, they were joined by 2,000 men from that province.

Urquiza had reclaimed from Rosas the control over the foreign relations of Entre Ríos Province at the Urquiza Announcement, of 1 May 1851. He had participated briefly in campaigns in Uruguay, forcing the end of the Uruguayan Civil War, and had formalized the alliance with Uruguay and Brazil.

In 1851 Rosas declared war on Brazil, which helped the signature of a treaty against him on 21 November 1851 by the governments of Entre Ríos, Corrientes, Uruguay and the Empire of Brazil.

To put the states of Entre Ríos and Corrientes in a situation to be able to help pay the extraordinary expenses they will have to make with the movements of their army, His majesty, the Emperor of Brazil would provide them, as a loan the monthly sum of one hundred thousand patacons for four months counting from the date in which these states ratify this agreement.

After removing the siege of Montevideo, the Ejército Grande started to form, with the forces there for the siege, and incorporating the soldiers from Buenos Aires province that were in the city. To this, many Brazilian forces were added. The new army crossed the Uruguay River camping in the town of Gualeguaychú. later they moved to the port of Punta Gorda (Diamante).

Between 24 December 1851 and 6 January 1852, the Ejército Grande crossed the Paraná River entering the territory of Santa Fe province. The infantry and artillery crossed in Brazilian Navy ships, while the cavalry crossed through swimming. Forty days later, on 3 February 1852, fought and obtained victory at Battle of Caseros near the city of Buenos Aires. Rosas, defeated, resigned from his governorship and was exiled to England.

== Forming the Ejército Grande ==
The army formed in Diamante on 20 December 1851, was as follows:

Commanding General: Governor and Captain General of the Province of Entre Ríos, Brigadier Justo José de Urquiza Major General: and Captain General of the Province of Corrientes, Colonel Major Benjamín Virasoro Total: 28,149 men, of which 2,000 were in the supply trains, cavalry support, and wounded/invalids.

=== Entre Ríos Army Corps ===
Total of 10,350 men:

- Artillery squadron, under the command of colonel José María Pirán with 230 men
- Roving Artillery Corps, under the command of lieutenant colonel González with 200 men
- Entre Ríos Infantry Battalion, under the command of lieutenant colonel Ramón Lista with 250 men
- Urquiza's Infantry Battalion, under the command of colonel Manuel Basavilbaso with 100 men
- Cavalry Division 1°, under the command of colonel Manuel Urdinarrain with 1,300 men
- Cavalry Division 2°, under the command of colonel Miguel Galarza with 1,500 men
- Cavalry Division 3°, under the command of colonel Manuel Palavecino with 1,100 men
- Cavalry Division 4°, under the command of colonel Domínguez (Pacheco with 600 men and Hernando with 700 men)
- Cavalry Division 5°, under the command of colonel Salazar with 500 men
- Cavalry Division 6°, under the command of colonel Apolinario Almada with 900 men
- Cavalry Division 7°, under the command of lieutenant colonel Paso 600 men
- Cavalry Division 8°, under the command of major López with 650 men
- Cavalry Division 9°, under the command of lieutenant colonel Jacinto González with 500 men
- San José Cavalry, under the command of lieutenant colonel Barón Alfredo Marbais du Graty with 300 men
- Urquiza's Guard, under colonel Fausto Aguilar with 270 men and colonel Manuel Carballo with 270 men
- General's Guard, under the command of lieutenant colonel Reyes with 200 men

=== Corrientes Army Corps ===
With a total of 5,260 men:

- Artillery squadron, under the command of lieutenant colonel González with 130 men
- Defensor Infantry Battalion, under the command of major Marcelino Martínez with 350 men
- Patricios Infantry Battalion, under the command of major Acevedo with 360 men
- Escort Cavalry, under the command of colonel José Antonio Virasoro with 750 men
- Cavalry 1° Regiment, under the command of colonel Manuel Antonio Ocampo with 680 men
- Cavalry 2° Regiment, under the command of colonel Bernardino López with 500 men
- Cavalry 3° Regiment, under the command of colonel Simeón Paiva with 540 men
- Cavalry 4° Regiment, under the command of colonel Nicanor Cáceres with 600 men
- Cavalry 5° Regiment, under the command of colonel Bejarano with 650 men
- Cavalry 6° Regiment, under the command of colonel Ricardes with 700 men

=== Buenos Aires Army Corps ===
With a total of 4,219 men:

- Artillery squadron, under the command of lieutenant colonel Bernardo Castro with 110 men
- Artillery squadron, under the command of lieutenant colonel Bartolomé Mitre with 100 men
- Buenos Aires Infantry Battalion, under the command of colonel Tejerina with 430 men
- San Martín Infantry Battalion, under the command of colonel Mariano Echenagucía with 430 men
- Constitución Infantry Battalion, under the command of colonel José Toledo with 430 men
- Federación Infantry Battalion, under the command of colonel Rodríguez with 430 men
- Cavalry 1°, under the command of colonel Tomás Burgoa with 430 men
- Cavalry 2°, under the command of colonel Manuel Hornos with 600 men
- Cavalry 3°, under the command of colonel Pedro León Aquino with 540 men
- Cavalry 4°, under the command of colonel Jacinto Susviela with 450 men
- Cavalry 5°, under the command of colonel Vicente González with 325 men

=== Uruguay Army Corps ===
With a total of 1,970 men, commanded by colonel César Díaz:

- Roving Artillery Corps, under the command of lieutenant colonel Nicolás de Vedia with 200 men
- Resistencia Infantry Battalion, under the command of colonel Lezica with 500 men
- Voltíjeros Infantry Battalion, under the command of lieutenant colonel León de Pallejas with 500 men
- Guardia Oriental Infantry Battalion, under the command of colonel José María Solsona with 490 men
- Orden Infantry Battalion, under the command of major Abella with 280 men

=== Brazil Army Corps ===
With a total of 4,020 men, commanded by brigadier Manuel Marques de Sousa:

- 1° Roving Artillery Regiment, under the command of major González Fontes with 200 men
- Batería de fuego a la Congreve, under the command of major González Fontes with 160 men
- Infantry Battalion N° 5, under the command of major López Persegueiro with 510 men
- Infantry Battalion N° 6, under the command of lieutenant colonel Ferreira with 600 men
- Infantry Battalion N° 7, under the command of lieutenant colonel Bruce with 490 men
- Infantry Battalion N° 8, under the command of major Resin with 540 men
- Infantry Battalion N° 11, under the command of lieutenant colonel Mello Albuquerque with 520 men
- Infantry Battalion N° 13, under the command of lieutenant colonel Ferreito Tamarindo with 452 men
- 2° Cavalry Regiment, under the command of lieutenant colonel Manuel Luis Osorio with 550 men

== See also ==
- Justo José de Urquiza
- Argentine Confederation
- Battle of Caseros
