= Frederico Mariath =

Portuguese-born Brazilian admiral (1794–1863)

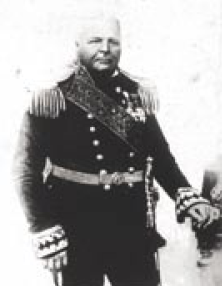
- Mariath, c. 1849–1863
- Born: 21 November 1794; Lisbon, Kingdom of Portugal
- Died: 2 July 1863 (aged 68)
- Military career
- Allegiance: Empire of Brazil
- Branch: Imperial Brazilian Navy
- Conflicts: Cisplatine War; Cabanagem; Ragamuffin War

Frederico Mariath (21 November 1794 – 2 July 1863) was a Portuguese-born Brazilian admiral in the Imperial Brazilian Navy who participated in the Cisplatine War and some of Brazil's internal conflicts of the early 19th century.

Mariath was born on 21 November 1794 in Lisbon and died on 2 July 1863.

== Major actions ==
=== Cisplatine War ===
==== Battle of Colonia del Sacramento ====
Mariath was put in command of a small squadron of four vessels stationed near Colonia del Sacramento. His mission was to defend the local fortifications, in coordination with the garrison of approximately 1,500 men under the command of brigadier Manuel Jorge Rodrigues.

On 26 February 1826, an Argentine squadron under the command of William Brown ran the blockade and appeared to challenge the garrison at Colonia. The men and guns of the Brazilian vessels had been landed to reinforce the fort, and the resulting confrontation was an inconclusive cannon duel, as a ground attack by troops from the Banda Oriental failed to materialize.

After repelling this initial attack, Mariath asked for assistance from Montevideo, but the commanding vice admiral Rodrigo Ferreira Lobo refused. On 1 March Brown launched a second attack. The night assault, supported by gunboats, was repelled after a bloody combat in which the Argentine troops suffered heavy losses but succeeded in destroying one Brazilian ship.

==== Battle of Quilmes ====
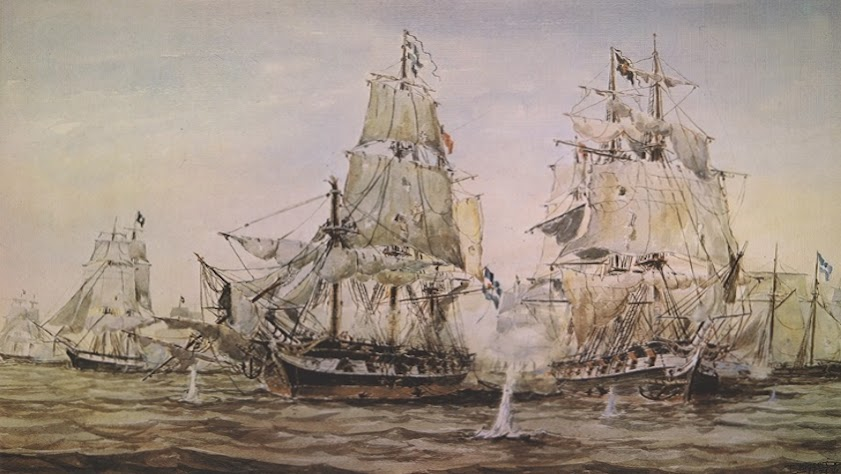
Battle of Quilmes

Later that year, he was put in command of a squadron consisting of the brig Caboclo, the corvette Maceió, and the frigate Nichteroy. He distinguished himself in the defense of the frigate Imperatriz on 26 April, in the battle of Ortiz Bank on 3 May, and the battle of Quilmes on 29 and 30 June. During this last battle, the concentrated fire of a number of Brazilian vessels succeeded in knocking the major Argentine frigate 25 de Mayo out of action.

On 12 May in Montevideo, admiral Rodrigo Pinto Guedes replaced Ferreira Lobo in command of the Brazilian naval forces operating in the Río de la Plata sector, often called the Equadra do Sul (Southern Squadron). Guedes decided to adopt a more aggressive strategy and divide his fleet in three parts to accomplish it. He put captain James Norton in command of a squadron (the Divisão Bloqueio) whose mission was to definitively blockade the strategic port of Buenos Aires. Another squadron (the Third Division), led by Jacinto Sena Pereira, was ordered to control the Uruguay river and thereby cut supply and communication lines between the Argentines and their army in the Banda Oriental. Mariath was put in charge of the reserve squadron, based at Colonia del Sacramento.

==== Battle of Juncal ====
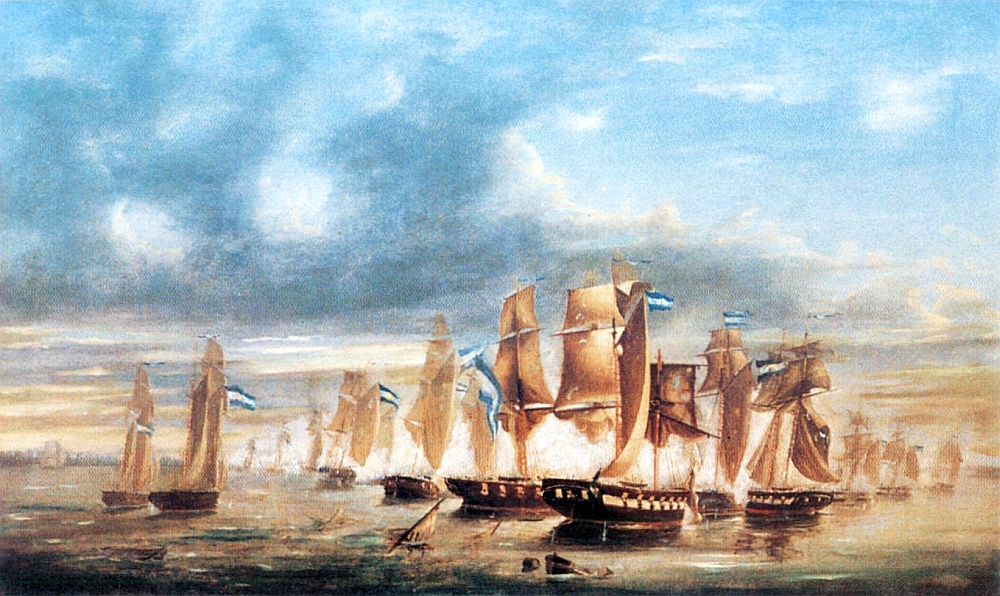
Battle of Juncal

Argentine commander William Brown soon began making plans to confront the Third Division. Fighting with a smaller force, he had to devise a way to keep the Brazilian squadrons from supporting each other, as any combination of squadrons would greatly outnumber his own fleet. His solution was to build a fort on Isla Martín García, at the mouth of the Uruguay river, with the purpose of protecting his flank as he chased the Third Division up the river as well as preventing the Mariath Division from reinforcing the Third.

Mariath made a timid attempt to bypass the fort on its less defended side, but the danger of sand banks, the existence of a mobile battery in the fort that could be moved to cover the alternate approach, as well as the advance of the Argentine fleet, resulted in retreat.

Thus, on 8 February 1827, when the Third Division began to descend the river to link up with Mariath, they found Brown waiting for them. In the ensuing battle of Juncal the Brazilian fleet was completely destroyed, with only 2 vessels escaping. Although Mariath was within earshot of the cannon fire, he thought an attempt to force his way past the fortifications was too risky. Mariath instead engaged in an extended gun duel with the fort, an ineffectual action which was eventually disrupted by a storm.

On 9 February, while the Third Division was pursued and finished off by Brown's squadron, the Mariath Division remained at a distance without intervening. The next day Mariath decided to retreat in the direction of Colonia del Sacramento, where he arrived the next week.

=== Civil wars ===
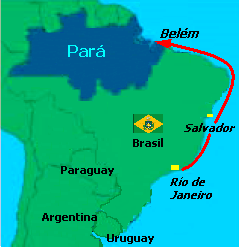
Revolt in Pará

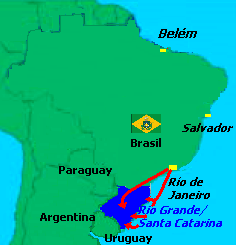
Revolt in southern Brazil

In 1835 a rebellion broke out in the Grão-Pará province. The rebels succeeded in taking the provincial capital, Belém, in response to which the Regency government sent a combined naval and land force. Although the government forces took the capital, the rebellion continued in the interior and the rebels eventually retook the city in August.

Mariath was sent as a replacement for the expedition's commander of naval forces, John Taylor. The navy proceeded to blockade the port, bombard rebel positions, land army troops, and conduct riverine patrols. The rebels were pressed hard and eventually abandoned the city and retreated again to the interior, where they would continue to fight until 1840.

1835 was also the year that a republican uprising broke out in southern Brazil, in particular the province of Rio Grande do Sul. This war was known as the Ragamuffin War.

In 1838 the Imperial government appointed Mariath as military commander in the province of Santa Catarina, with the mission of confronting the rebels. The revolution had extended to Santa Catarina, with the rebels proclaiming the Juliana Republic.

On 15 November, in command of a fleet of some 13 vessels carrying 33 guns and approximately 1,000 men, Mariath defeated the republican forces under Giuseppe Garibaldi at Laguna.
