= Battle of Banco de Ortiz =

1826 Cisplatine War naval battle

- Part of the Cisplatine War
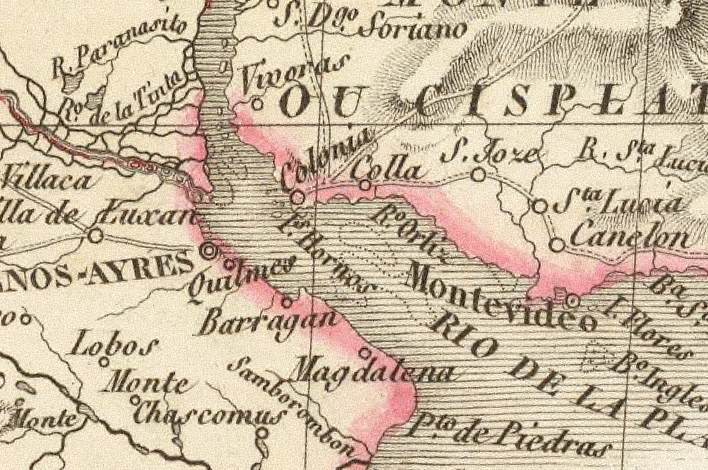
- The Río de la Plata in 1828, with the Ortiz Bank in the center.
| Date | 2 May 1826 |
| Location | Ortiz Bank, Cisplatina, Empire of Brazil 34°40′01″S 57°20′01″W |
| Result | Indecisive |

Belligerents
| Empire of Brazil | (Argentina) United Provinces |

Commanders and leaders
| James Norton | William Brown |

Strength
| 1 frigate 3 corvettes 9 schooners | 1 corvette 4 brigs 1 schooner |

The Battle of Banco de Ortiz, also known as the Battle of the Stuck Ships, took place on 2 May 1826 between ships of the United Provinces and of the Empire of Brazil. Neither side managed to achieve a decisive result.

== Background ==
After the Actions of 11 April and 27–28 April, Argentine commander William Brown started to sail near Maldonado. In 1 May, the schooner Sarandí, which was operating alone, returned with news of 11 Brazilian flagged ships sailing west of their position.

Brown then decided to attack Montevideo, as most of the enemy fleet were absent. On the early morning of May 2, the Argentine fleet, made up by a corvette, the Veinticinco de Mayo, 4 brigs and a schooner, was 6 miles away from the city; Brown then spotted that the Brazilian fleet was still in the harbor. While Brown detached part of his force to chase an enemy schooner, the Imperial ships raised their anchors.

At 7 AM, the Argentine fleet caught the schooner and started moving to the south, pursued by 13 Brazilian warships headed by the frigate Nichteroy under James Norton, followed by 3 corvettes and 7 schooners.

== Engagement ==
Five hours later, Brown's ships started to maneuver towards the enemy amidst a lull in the wind, and shots were exchanged between each fleet's flagships. Brown ordered the Sarandí, one of his brigs, to circle around the Nictheroy in order to harass it and keep it from throwing down its anchor, but the brig failed to do so. The rest of the Imperial fleet could not approach its flagship due to the fear of getting stuck in the shallow Ortiz bank, with the respective flagships already stuck.

Using its anchor, the Nictheroy eventually managed to clear the sandbank. The Brazilian fleet then decided to return to Montevideo. The Veinticinco de Mayo, which had also gotten stuck during the fight, only would clear the bank on the next day. Before returning to Buenos Aires, they stopped by Martín García Island to collect some cannon left there by the Brazilian garrison when they withdrew after the Battle of Colonia del Sacramento.
