= List of battles of the Paraguayan War =

Battles during the Paraguayan war

This is a list of battles that occurred during the Paraguayan War (1864–1870), also known as the War of the Triple Alliance.

- Battle of the Riachuelo – 11 June 1865
- Battle of Paso de Mercedes – 11 August 1865
- Battle of Paso de Cuevas – 12 August 1865
- Battle of Yatay – 17 August 1865
- Battle of Pehuajó or Corrales or Itati – 31 January 1866
- Battle of Estero Bellaco – 2 May 1866
- Battle of Tuyutí or Tuiutí – 24 May 1866
- Siege of Uruguaiana or Uruguayana – August/September 1865.
- Battle of Boquerón – 16 July 1866
- Battle of Curuzú – 1–3 September 1866
- Battle of Curupayty or Curupaiti – 22 September 1866
- Battle of Arroyo Hondo – 3 August 1867
- Battle of Tuyú Cué – 11 August 1867
- Passage of Curupayty – 15 August 1867
- Battle of Tatayibá – 21 October 1867
- Battle of Potrero Obella – 28 October 1867
- Battle of Tuyutí (second) – 3 November 1867
- Siege of Humaitá – November, 1866 until August 1868
- Passage of Humaitá – 19 February 1868
- Battle of Surubí – 23 September 1868
- Battle of Ytororó or Itororó – 6 December 1868
- Battle of Avay or Avahy – 11 December 1868
- Pikysyry maneuver – 21 December 1868
- Battle of Lomas Valentinas or Ita Ybate – 21–27 December 1868, fought in two days.
- Battle of Piribebuy or Peribebuí – 12 August 1869
- Battle of Acosta Ñu or Campo Grande – 16 August 1869
- Battle of Cerro Corá – 1 March 1870
