= Action of 27–28 April 1826 =

Cisplatine War naval battle

- Part of the Cisplatine War
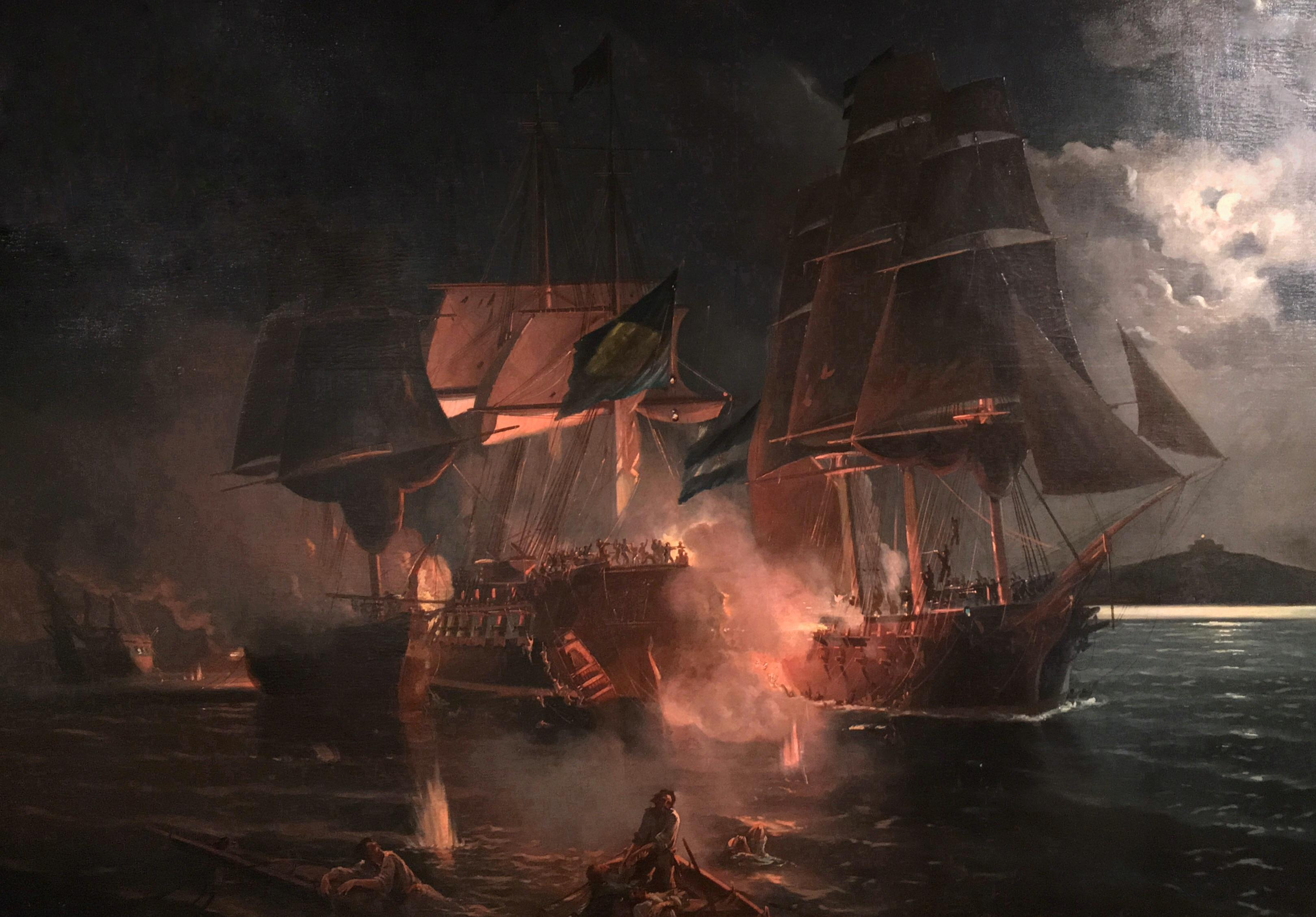
- Abordagem da Fragata Imperatriz, by Edoardo De Martino, 1875
Date	27 – 28 April 1826
Location	Off Montevideo, Cisplatina, Empire of Brazil
Result	Indecisive

Belligerents
Empire of Brazil	(Argentina) United Provinces

Commanders and leaders
Luís B. Pereira †	William Brown; Tomás Espora; Leonardo Rosales

Strength
1 frigate Total guns: 52	1 corvette 3 brigs 3 schooners Total guns: 90

Casualties and losses
3 dead 10 wounded 1 frigate damaged	3 dead 3 wounded 1 brig damaged

The action of 27 – 28 April 1826, also known as the Attack on the frigate Imperatriz, was an Argentine naval operation off Montevideo against the 52-gun Brazilian frigate Imperatriz, during the Cisplatine War. An Argentine force attempted to capture or sink it while it was isolated, in a plan similar to what had been implemented weeks earlier against the Nichteroy, but failed to do so.

== Background ==
After the Battle of Colonia do Sacramento in February 1826, where Argentine forces had had circa 200 casualties and lost a brig and three gunboats, their commander William Brown returned to Buenos Aires briefly, to execute emergency repairs, before quickly returning to Uruguayan waters, where he implemented a bold offensive strategy. On 11 April, he and his ships attempted to capture the Brazilian flagship Nichteroy but failed to do so.

By 26 April, Brown's ships had been repaired from the damage taken in the previous engagement, and, at the helm of the Veinticinco de Mayo, supported by three brigs and three schooners, sailed towards Brazilian-controlled Montevideo. Seeing no unusual activity from the Brazilian ships at this port, he decided to once again try to capture the Nichteroy.

== Engagement ==
The night between 27 and 28 April was dark enough to allow the seven ships to be indistinguishable from a distance, despite the full moon; they approached Montevideo in a slow pace. Boarding groups were readied in the Veinticinco de Mayo and the Independencia, one of the Argentine brigs, armed with pistols, machetes and axes, wearing white shirts over their uniforms to more easily be told apart from the enemy in the foreseen melee. One group should cut the ship's anchoring cable, another, set its sails, and the third, maneuver it. The plan depended on surprising the enemy ship, exiting the shallow harbor safely and not stumbling upon other enemy and neutral ships, despite lacking information on their positioning. The fact that the ship targeted was larger than the ships undertaking the raid, and was covered by coastal batteries, gunboats, and other ships, only made the situation more difficult.

At 8PM the Argentine flotilla realized that the squadron blockading Buenos Aires, under Admiral Rodrigo Ferreira Lobo, was anchored in Montevideo thanks to a recent storm. Despite the greater than expected opposing force, Admiral Brown decided to maintain his original plan. His force managed to approach a group of seven ships undetected, and, just before midnight, Brown, passing by the prow of a large frigate, hailed it, asking "What vessel is that?", receiving in return "That is nothing to you!". Knowing that in the earlier action on 11 April the British frigate HMS Doris had been nearby, and that the American frigate USS Cyane also should be nearby, he had to be sure not to attack a neutral ship. Colonel Antonio Toll y Bernadet reported they heard a dog and a rooster from inside the ship, which led Tomás Espora to deduce the ship to be Brazilian, as no British ships would have these animals on board, or would have been allowed to approach so closely without being alarmed by sentries. Brown still tried again to hail the ship, but received no answer, something which convinced him the ship was Brazilian and that they had lost the element of surprise.

The Vienticinco de Mayo then passed ahead of the enemy ship and let out a broadside. The enemy ship, the Imperatriz, was yet more powerful than the Nichteroy they'd faced earlier, bearing 52 guns, a crew of almost 400 men and 1070 tons. Its crew had been warned by the officer on deck, who had answered Brown originally. Soon Captain Luís Barroso Pereira was awake and directing his ship. Despite this, the fire from the Argentine ship had damaged it, making it unable to move away. It did fire its 18-inch guns and its crew soon started firing muskets at the surrounding ships. Brown kept his ship behind the Imperatriz so it could not fire broadsides at him, while he could. On the other end, the Independencia did the same. Brazilian return fire was intense, but due to the height of the frigate's line could not hit the enemy decks.

After some time, Brown gave the order to board, but the Independencia came in between his ship and the Imperatriz; after roughly an hour and fifteen minutes of exchanging fire, incapable of getting near enough to board, afraid of the impending arrival of the Brazilian fleet, attracted by the sound of the battle, Brown ordered a withdrawal. The Brazilian frigate was severely damaged, and its captain died in the fighting together with two other men. On the Argentine side, the Independencia was also severely damaged. Admiral Lobo allowed the Argentine fleet to withdraw without giving chase, which soon was cause for his sacking; his replacement was Pinto Guedes. Brown, while moving to Buenos Aires, met Lobo's fleet on 2 May in an indecisive battle.
