= Battle of Martín García (1827) =

Naval battle in the Cisplatine War

- Part of the Cisplatine War
Date	18 January 1827
Location	Off Martín García Island
Result	Brazilian victory

Belligerents
Empire of Brazil	(Argentina) United Provinces

Commanders and leaders
Frederico Mariath	William Brown

Strength
First engagement: 1 corvette; 1 schooner; Total guns: ~24; Second engagement: 1 corvette; 3 brigs; 4 schooners; Total guns: ~87	2 brigs 5 schooners 8 gunboats Total guns: ~45

Casualties and losses
6 dead 10 wounded	At least 1 brig damaged

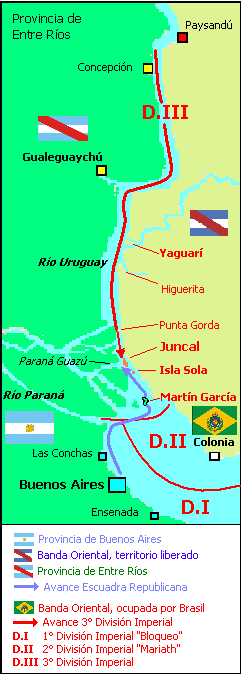
Map of the Uruguay River and dispositions of naval forces

The Battle of Martín García took place on 18 January 1827 in the Río de la Plata, off the Martín García Island. Two Brazilian ships were engaged by a small Argentine fleet, which withdrew after an hour. The Brazilian ships were reinforced and then reengaged by the Argentines, in an indecisive action.

== Background ==
On 10 December 1825, the Empire of Brazil declared war on the United Provinces due to their support to Uruguayan rebels which contested their rule of Cisplatina; the rebels had pledged their loyalty to the United Provinces during the Congreso de la Florida.

On 21 December, a powerful Imperial fleet under Vice admiral Rodrigo Lobo blockaded Buenos Aires. Over the following months, the smaller Argentine fleet managed to harass the Brazilian fleet and hurt the enemy country's shipping, but never seriously threaten the blockade, especially after their defeat at the Battle of Quilmes in July 1826.

== Engagement ==
In January 1827, the situation in the seas continued the same, with the blockade over Buenos Aires remaining active. Argentine forces had occupied the Martín García Island after it had been abandoned by its Brazilian garrison on the wake of the Battle of Colonia del Sacramento. Around that island was one of the three divisions of the Imperial fleet dedicated to blockading the United Provinces.

On 18 January, the Argentine fleet, led by William Brown, sortied out of Buenos Aires, sailing towards Martín García. There, its 2 brigs, 5 schooners and 8 gunboats met the Brazilian corvette Maceió and a schooner, the Dois de Dezembro, which had been sent to reinforce the Third Division of the blockade. After an hour of fighting, the Argentine force withdrew to Martín García; they would return four hours later, but by then the Brazilian force had been reinforced by the arrival of three brigs and three schooners, and, after another hour of fighting, the Argentine fleet withdrew definitely, with several ships damaged.
