= Battle of Martín García =

Battle of Martín García may refer to:

- Battle of Martín García (1814), a battle in the Second Banda Oriental campaign
- Battle of Martín García (1827), a battle in the Cisplatine War
