= Banrisul =

Banco do Estado do Rio Grande do Sul S.A.
- Type: Sociedade Anônima
- Traded as: B3: BRSR3, BRSR5, BRSR6
- Industry: Financial services
- Founded: 1928
- Headquarters: Porto Alegre, Brazil
- Key people: Cláudio Coutinho Mendes (CEO)
- Products: Banking
- Revenue: ▲US$ 3.0 billion (2017)
- Net income: ▲US$ 309 million (2017)
- Total assets: ▲US$ 24.7 billion (2017)
- Number of employees: 10,725
- Website: www.banrisul.com.br

Banrisul is a Brazilian bank. It is the largest bank of Southern Brazil and operates primarily in the state of Rio Grande do Sul (RS), with a network that serves more than 365 cities. It has more than 1,312 service points, over 500 agencies and 593 ATMs in Rio Grande do Sul, in the Federal District and in the states of Paraná, Rio de Janeiro, Santa Catarina and São Paulo; besides, it keeps agencies in Miami and Grand Cayman.

== History ==
In 1927, with the accomplishment of 1º Congress of Creators, appeared the proposal of the creation of a farm loan bank. The event, carried through with all the pomp and circumstance in the "Sao Pedro Theater", in Porto Alegre, aimed at to analyze the problems of the state economy, with direct focus on the crisis faced for "charqueadas" and all the production related to the cattle one.

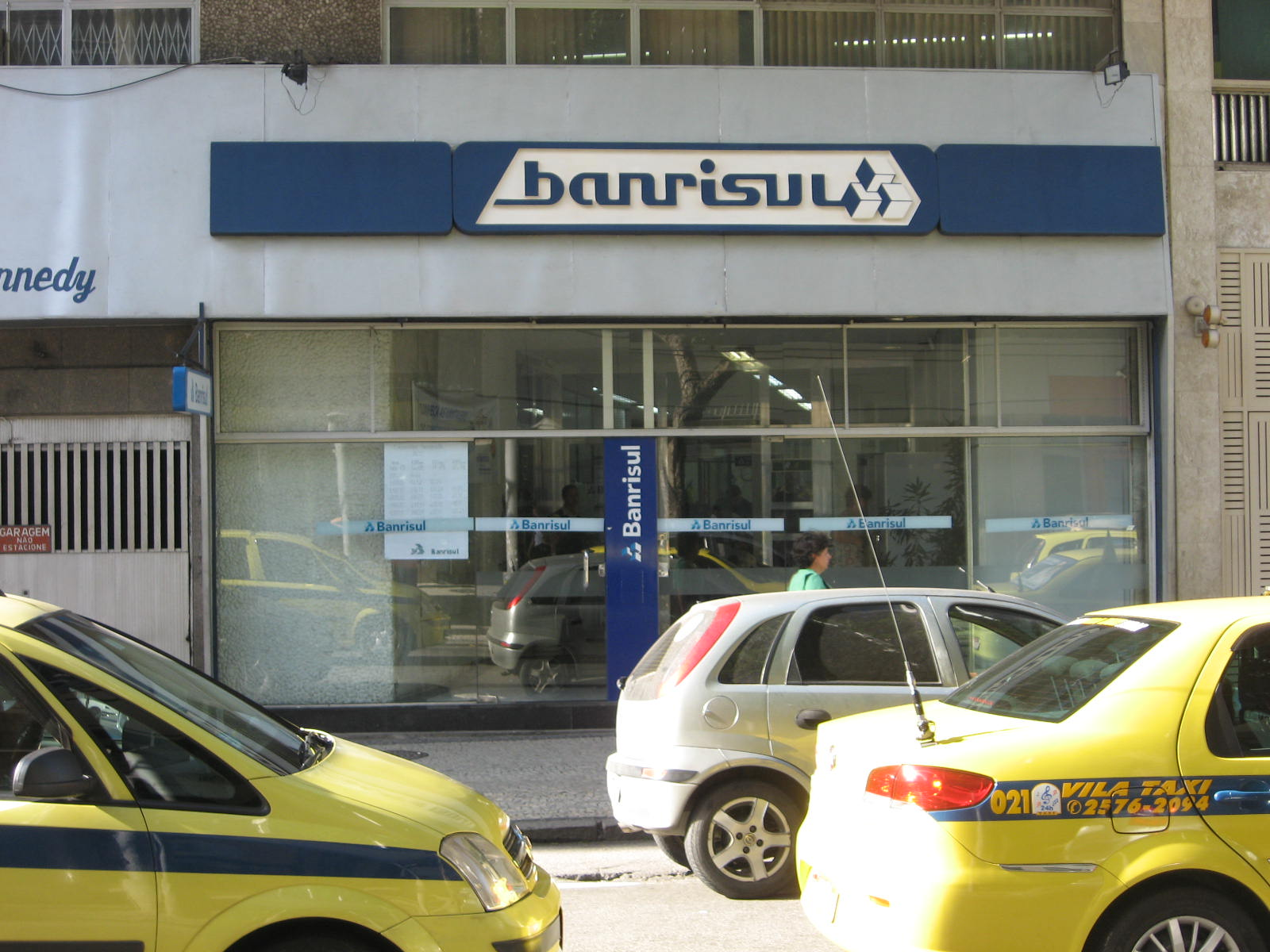
Banrisul branch in Tijuca, Rio de Janeiro

The arguments were strong excessively to pass unobserved for the federal government, and president Washington Luís lowered decree, authorizing the state to create a credit bank. To 10h of day 12 of September 1928, in solemnity that counted on the presence of then the president of the State, Getúlio Vargas, was created the Bank of the Rio Grande do Sul.

With an initial capital of 50 a thousand réis, the main objective of the new institution was to take care of the necessities of credit of the cattle gaucho. As official bank, the state taxation started to soon collect of beginning all, until then received for the "Banco Pelotense" (Pelotense Bank, in English), that later was incorporated by the Banrisul.

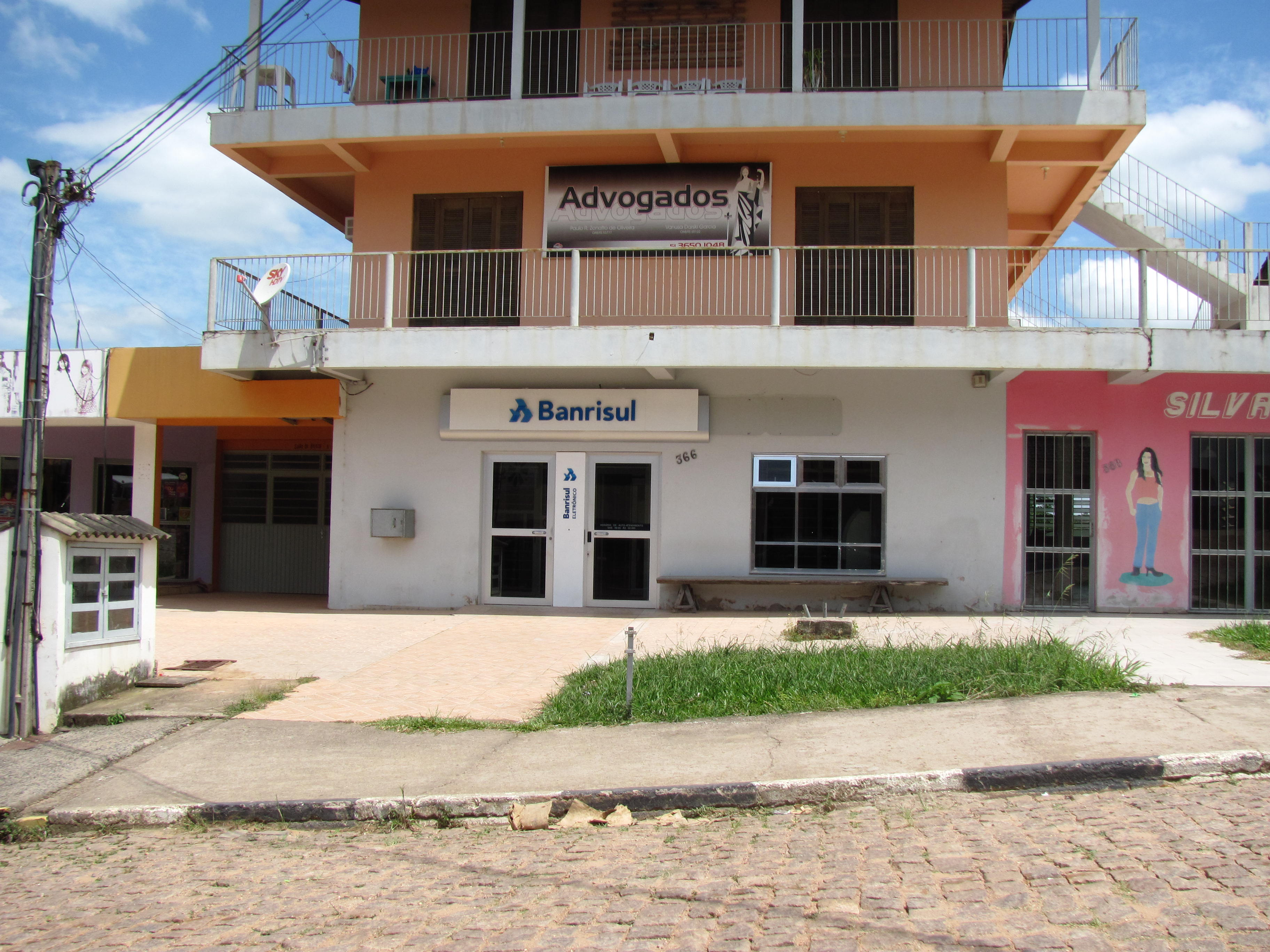
Smaller branch in Barão do Triunfo, RIo Grande do Sul

In 1969 and 1970, the institution incorporated, respectively, Banco Real de Pernambuco s.a. and the "Banco Sul do Brasil s.a." (South Bank of Brazil s.a., in English), extending its net until Pernambuco and Ceará, besides extending the number of existing agencies already in Santa Catarina, São Paulo and Rio de Janeiro. The opening of an agency in New York, in 1982, inserted the Banrisul in the group of international operators.

The decade of 1980s marked the beginning of the automation in the services of the bank. The massive investments effected since March 1991 had placed the institution in the vanguard of the banking automation in the State.

In March 1990, the Banrisul got authorization of the Brazilian Central Bank to operate as Commercial bank, with accounts receivables, of mortgage loans and credit, financing and investment.

In 1998, the Banrisul incorporated the agencies of the old "Caixa Econômica" (State Public, in English) saving bank, consolidating its position of bigger net of distribution of the south of the country, besides becoming a retail bank. The actions directed in credit facilities of long stated period had passed to be operated, in 2002, for "Caixa Estadual S.A." - Agency of Promotion.

== Advertising ==
Grêmio and Internacional, one of the most important soccer teams in Rio Grande do Sul, have been sponsored by Banrisul since 2001. Banrisul also sponsors most of the professional teams of the state, like those in the Gauchão.
