= Action of 11 April 1826 =

Cisplatine War naval battle

- Part of the Cisplatine War
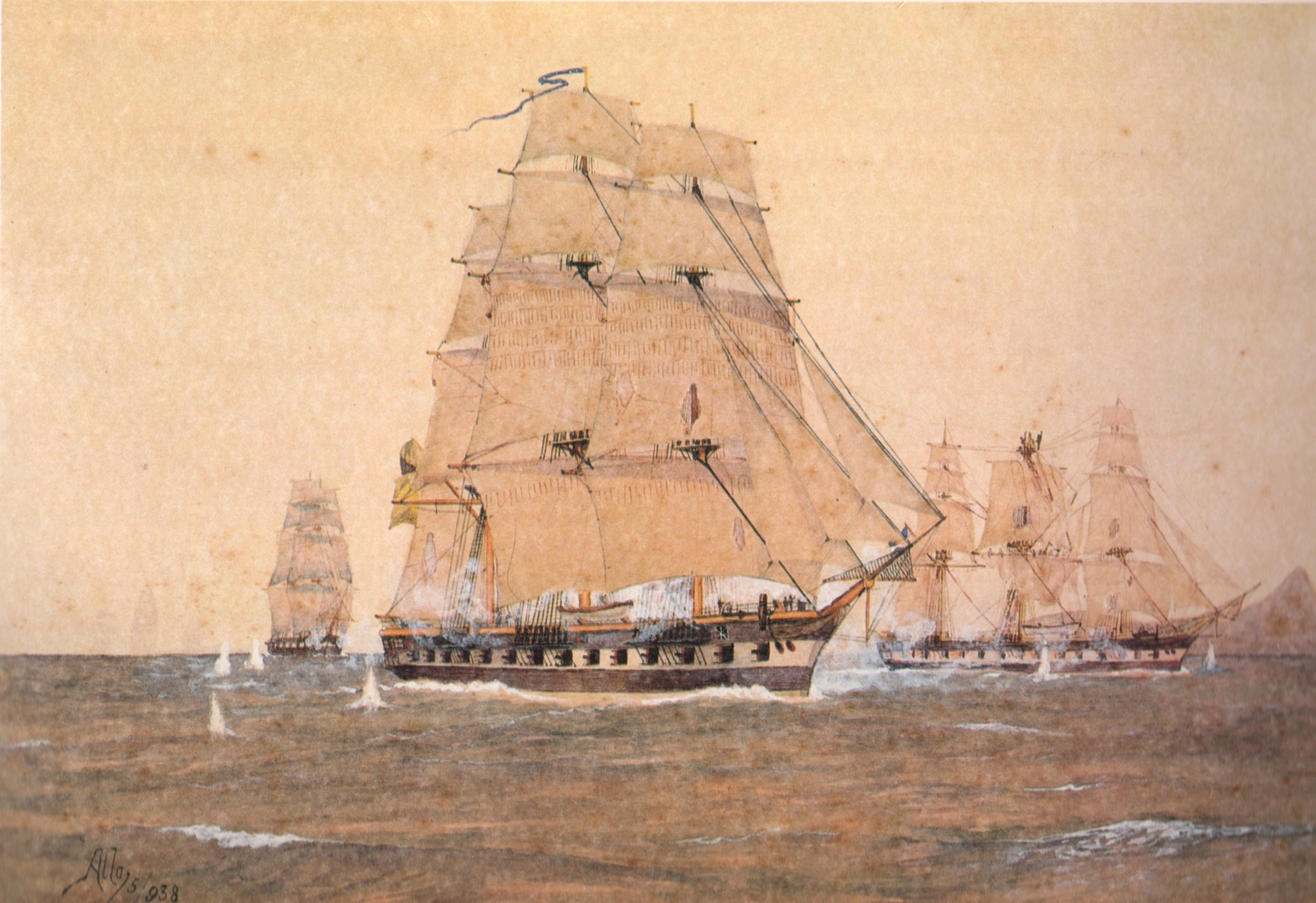
- Ataque à Fragata Niterói, by Trajano Augusto de Carvalho, 1938
Date	11 April 1826
Location	Off Montevideo, Cisplatina, Empire of Brazil
Result	Brazilian victory

Belligerents
Empire of Brazil	(Argentina) United Provinces

Commanders and leaders
James Norton	William Brown

Strength
1 frigate 4 schooners Total guns: ~58	1 corvette 1 brig Total guns: 54

Casualties and losses
5 dead 5 wounded	9 dead 14 wounded 1 corvette damaged

The action of 11 April 1826, also known as the Attack on the frigate Nichteroy or the Battle of Montevideo, was an Argentine naval operation off Montevideo against the 42-gun Brazilian frigate Nichteroy, during the Cisplatine War. An Argentine force attempted to capture or sink it while it was isolated, but failed to do so.

== Background and engagement ==
After the Battle of Colonia do Sacramento, where Admiral William Brown's troops had suffered hundreds of casualties and lost a brig and three gunboats to the Brazilian defenders, the Admiral decided to return to Buenos Aires. Despite the losses, however, Brown would rapidly reengage, sailing his force close to Montevideo, another city under Brazilian control. By capturing a merchant ship, they learned that the 42-gun frigate Nichteroy, Admiral James Norton's flagship, was near and unescorted, and he decided to try to capture it, mobilizing to this end a force composed of the corvette Veinticinco de Mayo and five brigs. They left their position on 9 April.

On April 10, Brown's forces captured the 5-gun schooner Isabela María while on their way to Montevideo. (Note: Carneiro claims this also happened on 11 April.) On the morning of the 11th, the Veinticinco de Mayo approached the city's port bearing a French flag. After making sure the Nictheroy was still were they expected it to be, Brown brought his ship near the British frigate HMS Doris and from there ordered it to quickly sail towards the Imperial ship, which sent a launch towards them. Seeing this, Brown ordered the Argentine flag be hoisted; once the Brazilian ship's crew recognized its adversary, they hoisted a red flag and fired two salvos towards it.

Having lost the element of surprise, and seeing that soon the odds would be stacked against his force, Brown signalled his brigs to join his flagship as they withdrew south, pursued by the Nictheroy. At this moment Brown still had plans to engage, aiming to separate the Brazilian frigate from its escort and then strike, but the Brazilian ships maintained their cohesion, and fighting began between both fleets. This lasted for three hours, until nightfall which separated the opposing forces, both having suffered relatively light casualties. (Note: Ratto claims this fight was against four Brazilian galleys, instead.)

While the Argentine commander failed in his plan to capture the Brazilian flagship, the low casualties suffered meant they could still harass Brazilian shipping and warships in the region; soon, they attacked the frigate Imperatriz.
