= José Joaquim de Andrade Neves, Baron of Triunfo =

José Joaquim de Andrade Neves Baron of Triunfo
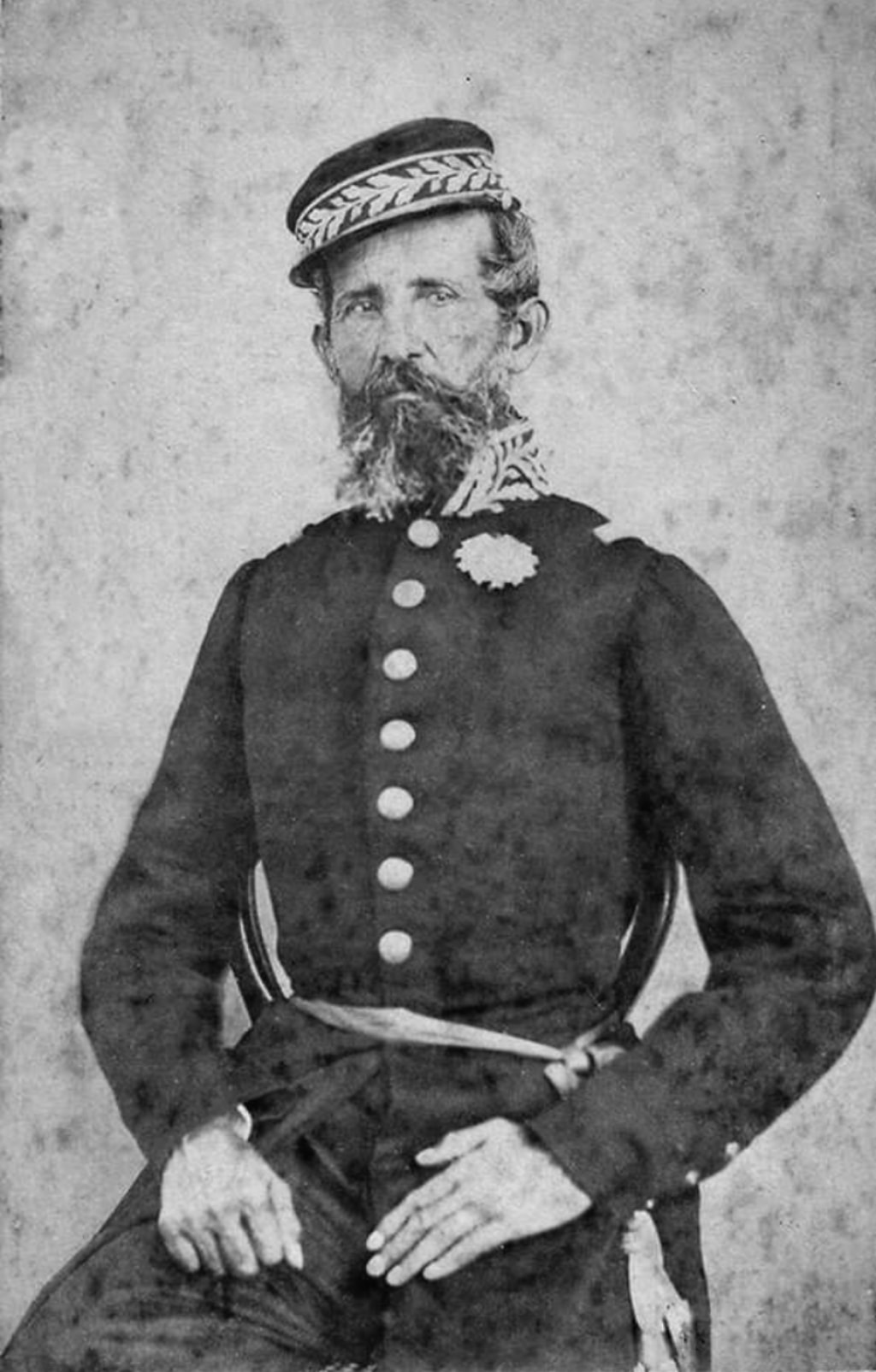
- Born: 22 January 1807; Rio Pardo, Rio Grande do Sul, Brazil
- Died: 6 January 1869 (aged 61); Asunción, Paraguay
- Military career
- Allegiance: Empire of Brazil
- Branch: Imperial Brazilian Army
- Service years: 1835–1869
- Rank: General
- Conflicts: Ragamuffin War; Battle of Fanfa; Battle of Barro Vermelho; Third siege of Porto Alegre; Battle of Taquari; Platine War; Battle of Morón; Uruguayan War; Paraguayan War; Humaitá campaign; Battle of Tuyú Cué; Battle of Paso Ipohy; Pikysyry campaign; Battle of Surubí; Battle of Avay; Battle of Lomas Valentinas (DOW)

José Joaquim de Andrade Neves, Baron of Triunfo (22 January 1807 – 6 January 1869) was a Brazilian general who was known for his service in the Paraguayan War.

== Biography ==
=== Early years ===
Neves was the son of José Joaquim de Figueiredo Neves and Francisca Ermelinda de Andrade, at the age of 19 he joined the 5th Cavalry Regiment. Shortly thereafter, he abandoned his military career to help his father on the family farm. He married Ana Carolina de Andrade Neves, with whom he had three children: Maria Adelaide de Andrade Neves, José Joaquim de Andrade Neves Filho and Luiz Carlos de Andrade Neves. He was the grandfather of José Joaquim de Andrade Neves Neto.

=== Military career ===
In 1835, when the Ragamuffin War broke out, Andrade Neves left agriculture, enlisting as a volunteer on the imperial side. He took an active part in a large number of battles as a member of the National Guard, having distinguished himself in the attack on the island of Fanfa on the Jacuí River, where Bento Gonçalves da Silva was taken prisoner. In the battle of Taquari Andrade Neves received two bullet wounds, however he remained on the battlefield until the end of the fight. Always equipped with a spear and at the head of his squadrons, he served the cause of legality until the Treaty of Poncho Verde.

Neves was then promoted to Major of the National Guard in 1840 and Lieutenant Colonel in 1841. From ensign to lieutenant colonel, he earned all his promotions on the battlefield through acts of bravery. For his bravery he was invited to join the Imperial Brazilian Army.

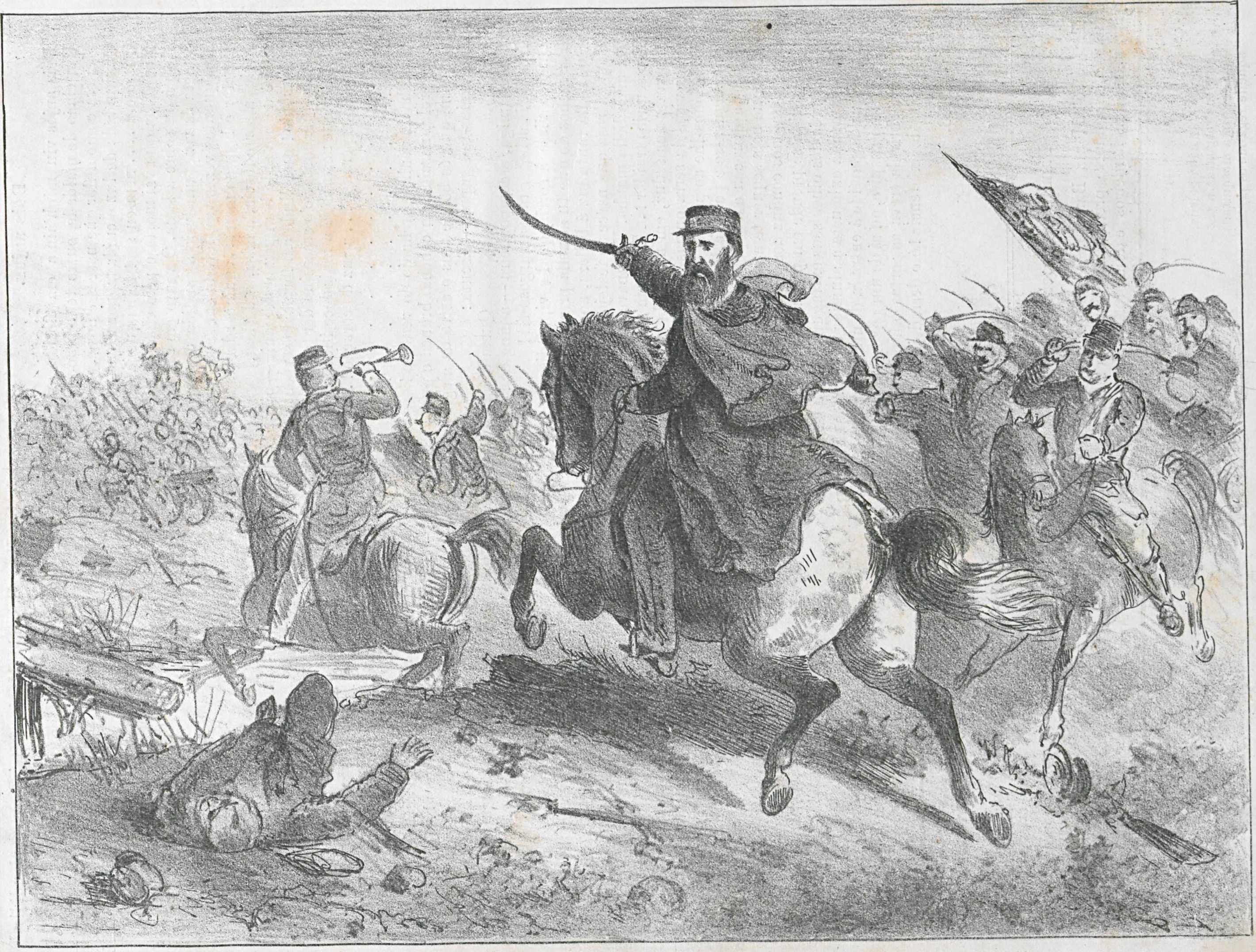
The Baron of Triunfo at the Surubi-hi River crossing on 26 September 1868, during the Paraguayan War

After a brief period of agriculture life and peace in the countryside, he returned to arms to fight in the Platine War, in 1851, gathering a group of volunteers, standing out in the Battle of Moron.

In 1864, at the time of the Brazilian invasion of the Oriental Republic of Uruguay, General Andrade Neves was at the head of the 3rd Cavalry Brigade. On the Great Siege of Montevideo, he was assigned to attack the Cerro fortress. The 3rd Brigade advanced and the garrison raised a white flag on the battlements of the wall. With the campaign in Uruguay concluding, by the treaty of 20 February 1865, the Imperial Brazilian Army marched on its way to Paraguay. In the capture of Tuyú Cué on 16 July 1867, his divisions took the Punta Carapá trench, forcing the Paraguayans to withdraw to Humaitá. On August 3, his men defeated seven hundred Paraguayan soldiers in Arroyo Hondo.

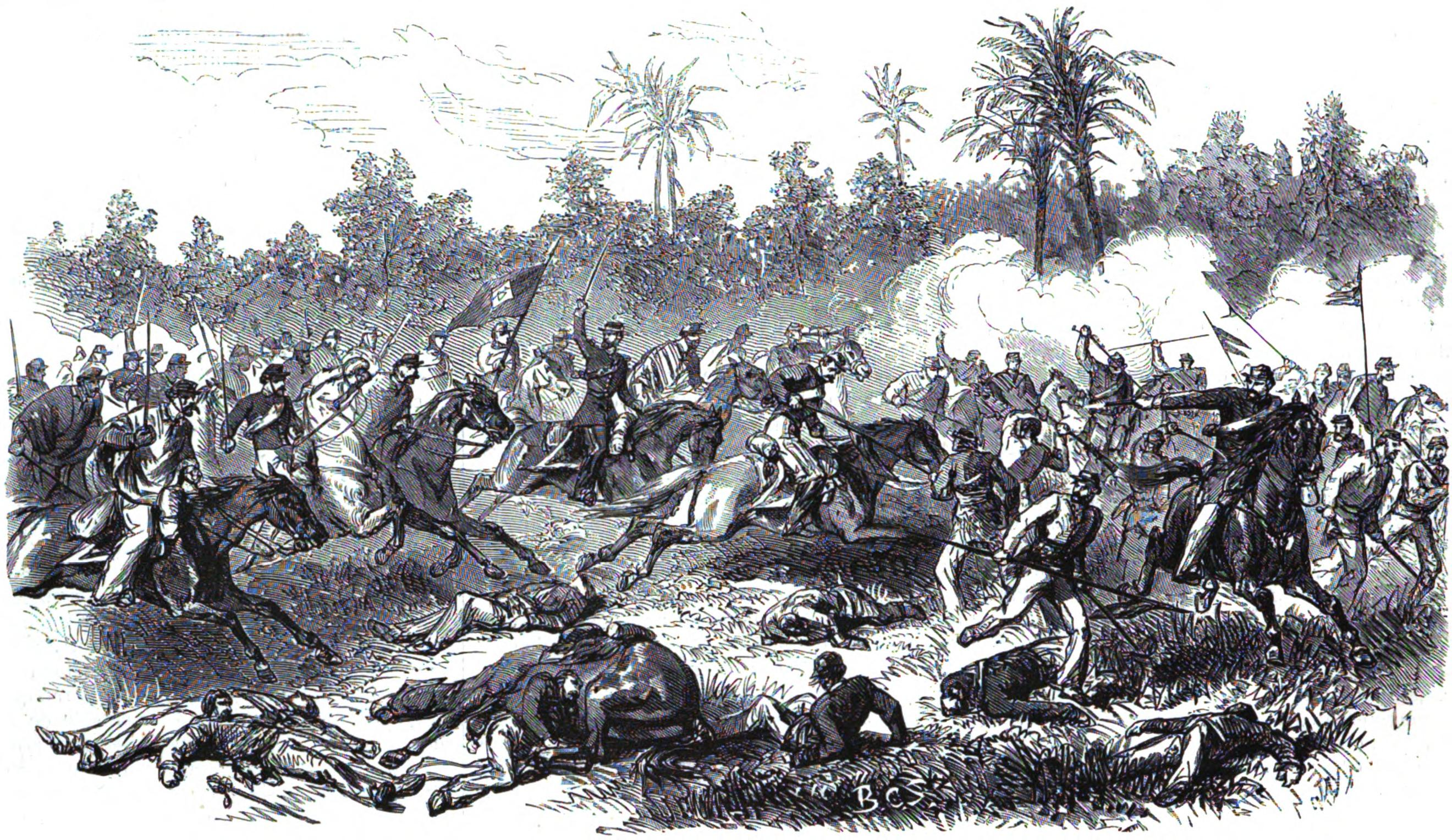
A cavalry charge led by Andrade Neves during the Battle of Arroyo Hondo on 3 August 1867

On 20 September, the Brazilians captured the city of Pilar. On 3 October, Neves and his men defended the city of San Solano and on October 21, they attacked four Paraguayan cavalry regiments and defeated them. Their division was dubbed by the Paraguayans as the Loca de Cuenta (crazy swept cavalry). Because of this victory he was made Baron of Triunfo (lit. 'Baron of the Triumph') on 19 October 1867.

From 1868 he led several reconnaissance missions to help in the Siege of Humaitá, at the same time he took over the fortress's Establishment which was defended by fifteen cannons and supported by two ships with artillery, in addition to two ditches and mouths. His men taking heavy losses, he was wounded and had his horse killed; he then had his cavalry troops dismount and attacked the fortress repeatedly until he took it. Neves also participated in the Battle of Avaí, and commanded the troops that attacked Lomas Valentinas from the left, managing to take them inside the fortified position.

In the middle of that fight, a bullet made a serious wound in his foot. Taken to Asunción, which had fallen to the Allies earlier, he was led to Solano López's palace to recover. In the delirium of the fever that devoured him, under that fiery climate, legend has it that the brave general, as if in that tragic moment a Spartan soul had animated him, thought that he was still ahead of his squadrons and, throwing down the covers, waved: " Comrades!... one more charge!" José Joaquim de Andrade Neves died in the palace on 6 January 1869.

== Legacy ==
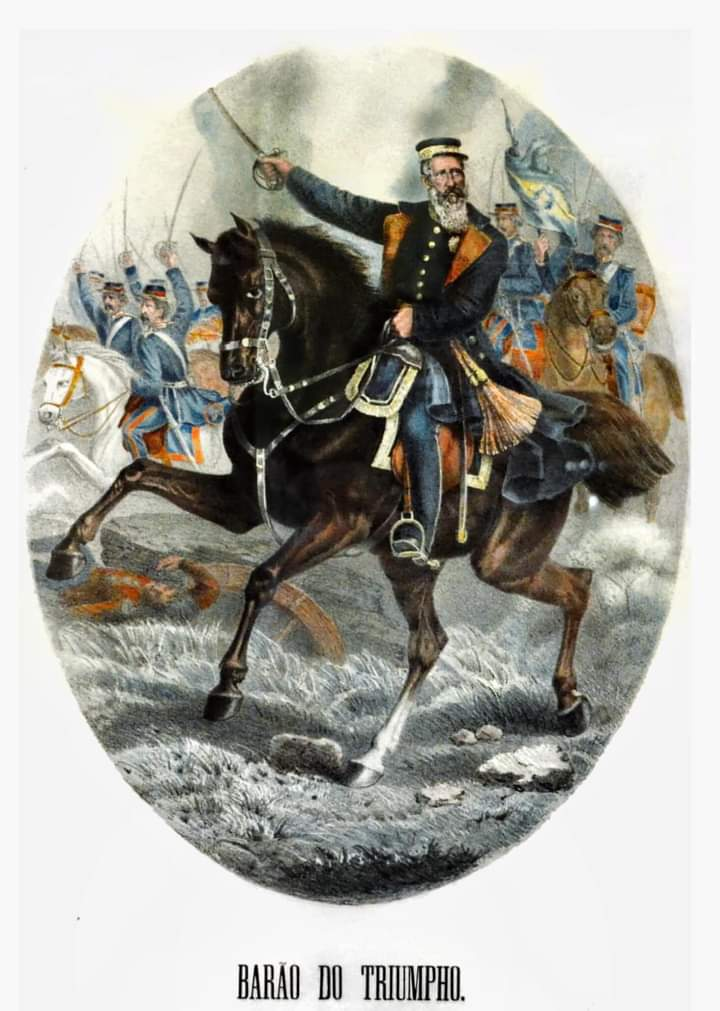
General Andrade Neves, Baron of Triunfo

He is honored by two streets in his state (Rio Grande do Sul)'s capital, Porto Alegre, and one street in its metropolitan region: Rua Andrade Neves, in the city center, Rua Barão do Triunfo, in the Menino Deus neighborhood, and Rua Gen Andrade Neves, in the Harmonia district, in Canoas. The first of them, in the same year of his death, the City Council of Porto Alegre changed the name from Rua Nova [New Street] to Rua General Andrade Neves. In Bagé, also in Rio Grande do Sul, one of the main streets in the city center is called Rua Barão do Triunfo. In Joinville, in the state of Santa Catarina, there is also a street, in the high-class neighborhood of América, which bears its title as its name, Rua General Andrade Neves. In his hometown, Rio Pardo, he is the namesake of the most important street in the city: Avenida Andrade Neves. Gaucho cities such as Santa Maria, Pelotas, Cachoeira do Sul and Canguçu also have streets in his honor. Besides these, there are still many others in the interior of Rio Grande do Sul.

A city in Rio Grande do Sul, Barão do Triunfo, is named after him.

Also, in Belo Horizonte, Minas Gerais' state capital, in the Gutiérrez district, there is a Rua General Andrade Neves. In addition, the streets General Andrade Neves, in the São Domingos neighborhood in the municipality of Niterói, the Rua Andrade Neves, in the Tijuca neighborhood, in the municipality of Rio de Janeiro, the Rua General Andrade Neves in the Vila Urussaí neighborhood, in the municipality of Duque de Caxias, and also in Petrópolis, there is a street titled Rua Barão do Triunfo, in the Ingelheim Quarter, all in the state of Rio de Janeiro. In the capital of Pará, Belém, there is a lane named Barão do Triunfo, which begins in the Sacramenta neighborhood, crosses the Pedreira and ends in Marco. In the city of São Paulo, the Barão do Triunfo street, a very tree-lined street in the Brooklin neighborhood. In Campinas, one of the main avenues of the city, which connects the old railway station (today the Estação Cultura) to the Castelo district, has his name. In João Pessoa there is a Barão do Triunfo avenue located in the Varadouro district.

He was, for decades, seen as an icon within the Brazilian Cavalry.
