= Battle of Taquari =

Pivotal battle of the Ragamuffin War

- Part of the Ragamuffin War
Date	3 May 1840
Location	Caramujo, Taquari, Rio Grande do Sul, Empire of Brazil
Result	Indecisive

Belligerents
Piratini Republic	Empire of Brazil

Commanders and leaders
Bento Gonçalves; Antônio de Sousa Neto	Manuel Jorge Rodrigues; John Pascoe Grenfell

Strength
3,360 men	4,300 men

Casualties and losses
35 dead 114 wounded 28 missing	201 casualties

The Battle of Taquari took place on 3 May 1840 between troops from the breakaway Riograndense Republic and forces loyal to the Empire of Brazil during the Ragamuffin War. It was the largest battle of the conflict, involving nearly 10 thousand men altogether, but neither side managed to take the upper hand in it, with the bulk of the Imperial force withdrawing in the night before combat. The battle was determined by the concurring third siege of Porto Alegre.

== Background and engagement ==
The Ragamuffin War, pitting the Empire of Brazil against rebels from the province of Rio Grande do Sul, had been raging on for close to 5 years, with many indecisive battles. As the provincial capital Porto Alegre was besieged by the rebels for the third time during the conflict, both armies met at the shore of the Taquari River to fight; the Imperials, however, were hampered by the poor state of their horses and decided to withdraw.

As the bulk of the Imperial force crossed over the river, a group of men, both caçadores and men of the National Guard, stood to guard the river crossing, under Lieutenant Colonel Andrade Neves. The latter, when combat with the Ragamuffin army was met, was shot twice, but refused to withdraw before the battle ended.

The battle ended indecisively.
