= Battle of Paso Ipohy =

Part of the Paraguayan War

- Part of the Humaitá campaign
Date	December 25, 1867
Location	Tebicuary River, Paraguay
Result	Paraguayan victory

Belligerents
Paraguay	Empire of Brazil

Commanders and leaders
Valois Rivarola; Eduardo Vera	Baron of Triunfo

Strength
150–300	1,000–1,500

Casualties and losses
20 casualties	400–800 casualties

The Battle of Paso Ipohy was an action planned by the Paraguayans that consisted of a surprise attack on a Brazilian camp near Humaitá, near the Tebicuary River in Paraguay, on December 25, 1867. The attack resulted in the victory of the outnumbered Paraguayans.

== The Battle ==
A Brazilian camp for Volunteers of the Fatherland was deployed near the Tebicuary River in Paso Ipohy in Paraguay. Francisco Solano López realized that he could take a heavy blow to Brazilian troops there, as the surrounding region consisted of swamps and puddles that could facilitate a surprise action. Valois Rivarola, chosen by Mariscal to plan the attack, selected Captain Eduardo Vera and 150 of his best men for the task. Armed only with sabers and machetes, Vera's troops silently approached the Brazilian tents and attacked, taking them completely by surprise, and inflicting about 400 casualties without losing a single man. Soon the Brazilians recovered from this attack and began to pursue the Paraguayans across the lagoons and swamps. The better equipped among them reached some Paraguayans and shot them down with rifles, but were repelled by hidden Paraguayan artillery, as they moved too far from their base.

Everyone who participated in the attack was rewarded by López, who gave 20 pesos to the soldiers and 40 pesos to the officers. Eduardo Vera was promoted to Major and Rivarola was congratulated for the plan.
