= Manuel Jorge Rodrigues, 1st Baron of Taquari =

Brazilian general and politician (1777–1845)

Baron of Taquari

President of the Province of Pará
- In office 25 June 1835 – 14 November 1835
- Preceded by: Francisco Pedro Vinagre
- Succeeded by: Eduardo Angelim

Personal details
- Born: 23 April 1777 Lisbon, Kingdom of Portugal
- Died: 14 May 1845 (aged 68) Rio de Janeiro, Empire of Brazil
- Occupation: Military officer, politician

Military service
- Allegiance: Kingdom of Portugal; United Kingdom of Portugal, Brazil and the Algarves; Empire of Brazil
- Branch/service: Portuguese Army; Imperial Brazilian Army
- Years of service: 1794–1845
- Rank: Lieutenant general
- Battles/wars: Peninsular War; Battle of Bussaco; Battle of Fuentes de Oñoro; Siege of Ciudad Rodrigo; Siege of Badajoz; Battle of Orthez; Battle of Toulouse; Cisplatine War; Battle of Colonia del Sacramento; Cabanagem; Ragamuffin War

Manuel Jorge Rodrigues, 1st Baron of Taquari, (23 April 1777 – 14 May 1845) was a Portuguese-born Brazilian general and politician. A veteran of the Peninsular War, Rodrigues distinguished himself in many battles during that campaign fighting alongside the British. During the Cisplatine War he commanded the defense of the town of Colonia del Sacramento from an Argentine attack over the course of February–March 1826. Later on he also fought internal revolts in Brazil. Rodrigues briefly held the office of president of the Pará province during the Cabanagem revolt in 1835, after which he was sent to southern Brazil in order to fight the rebels in the Ragamuffin War, the longest civil war in Brazilian history, that broke out during the Regency period in the provinces of Rio Grande do Sul and Santa Catarina.

== Biography ==
Manuel Jorge Rodrigues was born on 23 April 1777 in Lisbon. On 18 September 1794 he joined the Infantry Regiment 8 of the Portuguese army, quickly reaching the rank of alferes by decree on 24 June 1807. In 1808 he was commissioned in the rank of captain, taking part in the Peninsular War and tasked with organizing the first battalion of Caçadores, being effectively promoted to captain on 21 January 1809.

Over the course of the 1810s Rodrigues took part in several battles, most notably Bussaco, Fuentes de Oñoro, Ciudad Rodrigo, Badajoz, Orthez and Toulouse. In Toulouse he commanded the first battalion of Caçadores, distinguishing himself in the battle, which earned him the praise of the commander of his brigade. In 1815 he earned a British medal for his role in the battles of Orthez and Toulouse.

On 22 June 1818 he was promoted to lieutenant colonel, disembarking on Rio de Janeiro that same year, in command of the first battalion of Caçadores of the Division of Royal Volunteers. He then traveled south to the Cisplatina province where he assumed command of the town of Colonia del Sacramento, being promoted to colonel still in 1818.

On 26 February 1826, during the Cisplatine War between the Empire of Brazil and the United Provinces of the Río de la Plata, Argentine admiral William Brown attempted to take Colonia del Sacramento with a large ship squadron and combining his actions with Juan Antonio Lavalleja, who was sieging the town on land. Rodrigues resisted all attacks, which only ended on March 14, effectively defending the town and preventing its capture. On 4 April 1826 he was promoted for distinction to the rank of field marshal.

In 1828 he was given command of the observation division which remained in Montevideo, being replaced in that post by general Soares de Andrea, in order to assume the command of arms of the province of Rio Grande do Sul. Appointed on 14 March 1829, Rodrigues held that post until March 1830, when he was removed to an identical position in the province of Minas Gerais, returning to the Court in 1831, having been replaced in this last command. in 1835 he requested to retire, which was denied.

In April 1835 Rodrigues was appointed by the regency to both the offices of president and commander of arms of the province of Pará, taking office on 25 June 1835. The province was being ravaged by a revolt. The rebels attacked the capital of the province on August 14, killing Rodrigues' son, captain Jerônimo Herculano Rodrigues. Jorge Rodrigues was dismissed from his office in November 14 of that same year, retiring to the court in Rio de Janeiro and being commissioned to the rank of lieutenant general.

The Ragamuffin War in Rio Grande do Sul was a serious matter of concern for the regency, which was not satisfied with the direction given to war operations by field marshal Antônio Elzeário. Elzeário was dismissed from the command-in-chief of the Brazilian army in the south, and, by decree of 23 May 1839, lieutenant general Manuel Jorge Rodrigues was appointed to substitute him. Rodrigues embarked for the province of Rio Grande do Sul, immediately assuming command of its high position in July, and by decree of 2 December 1839, he was promoted to lieutenant general effective.

Hoping to receive aid and material for his army, Rodrigues went on to the campaign, in order to fight the revolutionaries that were besieging Porto Alegre, such aids, however, were delayed. Elzeário had tried to relieve the siege of Porto Alegre on two occasions, but failed. General Bento Gonçalves, leader of the rebels, aware of the delays, left his position in the outskirts of Porto Alegre, crossing the Caí River, looking for Rodrigues and his army, finally finding him encamped on the left bank of the Taquari river. A close battle then took place on 3 May 1840, lasting for more than an hour, being later called the Battle of Taquari, with Jorge Rodrigues being advantageously assisted by a navy squadron under the command of John Pascoe Grenfell. On 14 July 1840, Rodrigues was relieved of his command, being praised for the services he rendered in the south. In 1842 he assumed the position of Governor of the Arms of the Court.

Manuel Jorge Rodrigues was granted the title of Baron of Taquari by decree of 25 March 1845 in reward for the long services he had rendered. He died a few months later, on 14 May 1845, in Rio de Janeiro. His remains were buried in the catacombs of the São Francisco de Paula church.

== Bibliography ==
- Carranza, Angel Justiniano (1916). Campañas navales de la Republica Argentina: Tomo IV (in Spanish). Buenos Aires.
