= Battle of Surubí =

- Part of the Pikysyry campaign
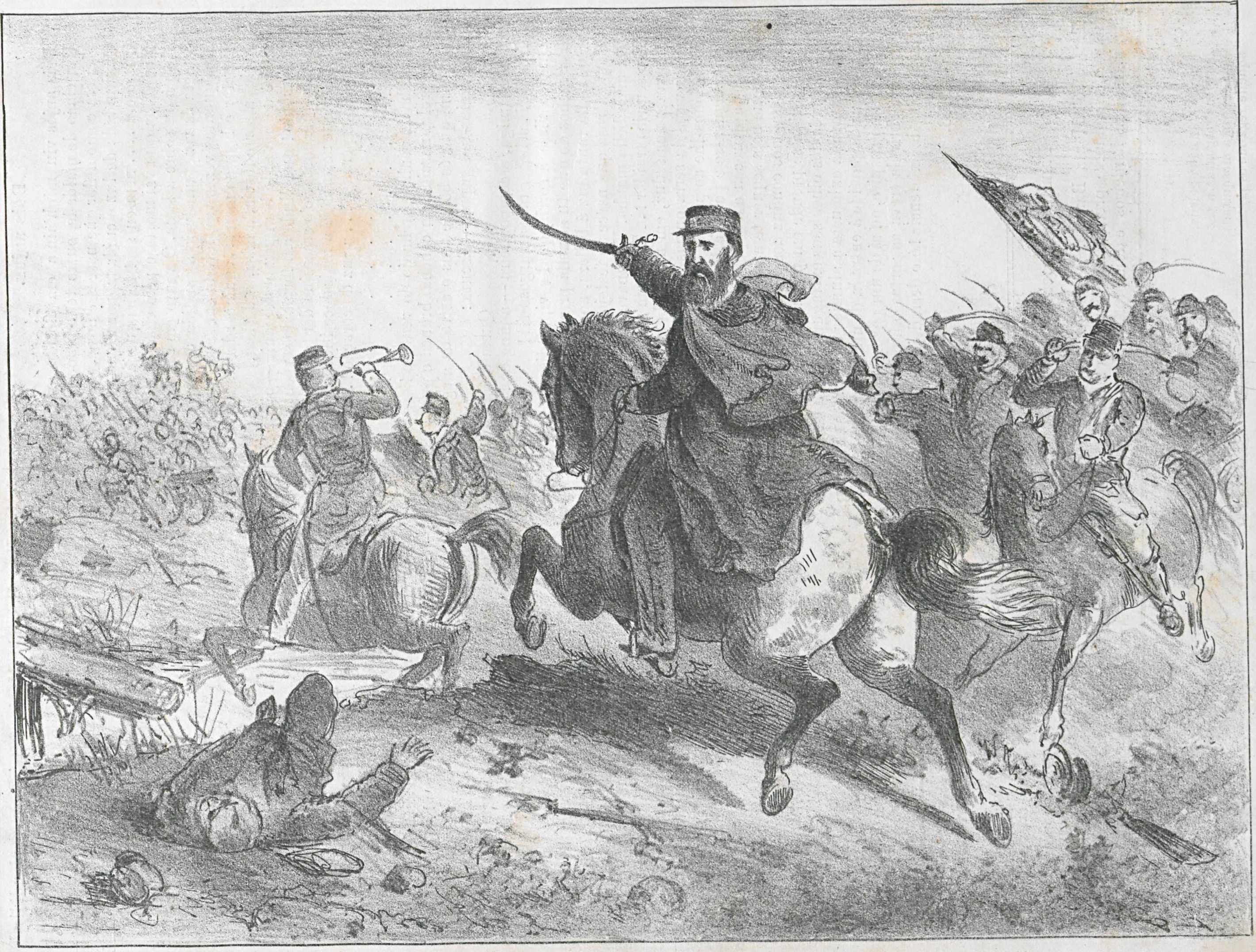
- The Baron of Triunfo at the combat over the Surubí stream
Date	23 September 1868
Location	Surubí stream, Paraguay
Result	Brazilian victory

Belligerents
Paraguay	Empire of Brazil

Commanders and leaders
José Manuel Montiel; Julián Roa	Baron of Triunfo; Herculano Pedra

Casualties and losses
128 casualties 11 prisoners	89 dead 203 wounded 2 prisoners

The Battle of Surubí (also spelt Suruby, Surubi-í, Surubi-hi, etc.) was fought in 23 September 1868, during the opening stages of the Paraguayan War's Pikysyry campaign.

The allied army marched north, towards Paraguay's capital Asunción after the fall of the fortress of Humaitá a few weeks earlier. On the morning of 23 September, the Brazilian vanguard under General Andrade Neves, Baron of Triunfo, met two Paraguayan detachments at a bridge over the Surubí stream and beat them.

== The engagement ==
The Brazilian vanguard, after crossing the bridge over the Surubí stream, was surprised by a large Paraguayan force, partially hidden by thick brush on the river's shore. The attackers were initially forced to retreat over the bridge, and only after a second attack by two squadrons of the 6th Cavalry Regiment was the Paraguayan position taken.

One of the Brazilian units, the 2nd Division's 5th Infantry Battalion, fled the action in disorder, and was dissolved.
