= Cabanagem =

1835–1840 separatist movement in Brazil

Cabanagem Revolution
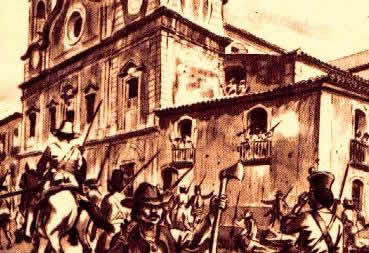
- Cabanagem Revolution
Date	1835–1840
Location	Grão-Pará, Empire of Brazil (now Belém, Brazil)
Result	Empire of Brazil victory

Belligerents
Empire of Brazil	Cabanos

Commanders and leaders
(Empire of Brazil) Manuel J. Rodrigues; (Empire of Brazil) John Pascoe Grenfell; (Empire of Brazil) Joaquim M. Lisboa	Eduardo Angelim; João Batista Gonçalves Campos; Manoel Vinagre; Francisco Pedro Vinagre; Antonio Vinagre; Vicente Ferreira Lavor Papagaio; Félix Malcher †

Strength
6,000 imperial soldiers; 3,000 volunteers; 10,000 civil militia	25,000 insurgents

Casualties and losses
- More than 40,000 dead (soldiers, militia, rebels and civilians)

The Cabanagem (Portuguese pronunciation: [kabaˈnaʒẽj]; 1835–1840) was a popular revolution and pro-separatist movement that occurred in the then province of Grão-Pará, Empire of Brazil.

Among the causes for this revolt were the extreme poverty of the Paraense people, oppression by the Empire of Brazil, and the political irrelevance to which the province was relegated after the independence of Brazil. The elite agriculturists of Grão-Pará, while living much better, resented their lack of participation in the central government's decision-making, which was dominated by the provinces of the Southeast and Northeast.

The name "Cabanagem" refers to the type of hut used by the poorest people living along the waterways of northern Brazil, principally caboclos, freed slaves, and indigenous people. Their goal was to be more involved in government decisions, ultimately seeking the economic development of Grão-Pará.

It is thought that 30–40% of the population of Grão-Pará, estimated at 100,000 people, died. In 1833 the Province had 119,877 inhabitants, consisting of 32,751 Amerindians, 29,977 black slaves, 42,000 mixed-race people, and a White minority of 15,000, over half of them Portuguese.

== Background ==
During independence, Grão-Pará mobilized itself to expel reactionary forces which tried to reintegrate Brazil into the Portuguese Empire. Until 1822 Grão-Pará had been a separate viceroyalty from Brazil, reporting itself directly to Portugal; after Brazilian independence Grão-Pará decided to join Brazil. In the struggle for independence, which dragged on for several years, the canon and journalist João Batista Gonçalves Campos, the Vinagre brothers and the farmer Félix Clemente Antônio Malcher stood out. Several lodges of fugitive slaves formed, and there were frequent military rebellions. Once the fight for independence ended and a provincial government named by the Brazilian Emperor was installed, the local leaders were marginalized from power.

In July 1831 – a few months after the abdication of Emperor Pedro I of Brazil at Rio de Janeiro – a rebellion in the military garrison of Belém do Pará broke out, and Batista Campos was imprisoned as one of the implicated leaders. The indignation of the poor grew, and in 1833 already there was talk of converting Brazil into a federation. The provincial president, Bernardo Lobo de Souza, unleashed a repressive political wave, in an attempt to contain the separatists. The climax was reached in 1834, when Batista Campos published a letter from the Bishop of Pará, Romualdo de Sousa Coelho, criticizing various politicians from the province. For not having permission from the provincial government, Campos was persecuted, and sought refuge on the fazenda of his friend Clemente Malcher. Meeting the Vinagre brothers (Manuel Vinagre, Francisco Pedro Vinagre, and Antônio Vinagre) and the India-rubber collector and journalist Eduardo Angelim they joined a contingent of rebels on Malcher's plantation. Before being attacked by government forces, they abandoned the plantation. Nevertheless, on November 3, troops managed to kill Manuel Vinagre and hold Malcher and other rebels. Batista Campos died on the last day of the year, apparently because of an infection caused by a cut he suffered while shaving.

== The movement ==
Map of the province of Grão Pará

On the night of January 6, 1835, the rebels attacked and conquered the city of Belém, assassinating president Lobo and the Army Commander, and acquiring a large quantity of munitions. On January 7, Malcher was released and was chosen as president of the province, with Francisco Vinagre as the Army Commander. The government did not last long, due to Malcher, with the support of the upper class, attempted to keep the province united to the Brazilian empire. Francisco Vinagre, Eduardo Angelim, and the other rebels attempted to separate. The break happened when Malcher ordered Angelim taken. The rebellion broke into factions, and the side of Francisco Vinagre was victorious. Clemente Malcher was assassinated, and his body was dragged through the streets of Belém.

Now in the presidency and the Army Command of the Province, Francisco Vinagre was not able to keep his supporters faithful. If it were not for the intervention of his brother Antônio, he would have yielded the government to imperial control, in the person of marshall Manuel Jorge Rodrigues in July 1835. Due to this weakness and the resurgence of a squadron commanded by the English admiral Taylor, the rebel forces were destroyed and retired toward the interior. Reorganizing their forces, they again attacked Belém on August 14. After nine days of battle, and suffering the death of Antônio Vinagre, they retook the capital.

Eduardo Angelim assumed the presidency. For ten months, the elite were alarmed by the rebel control over the province of Grão-Pará. The lack of a plan with concrete means to consolidate the rebel government again provoked a weakness in the ranks. In March 1836, the brigadier Francisco José de Sousa Soares de Andrea was named president of the province. His first measure was to attack the capital again, which was carried out in April 1836, and as a result of which the rebel group decided to abandon the capital in favor of resistance from the interior.

The central government used European mercenaries to combat the revolt. Naval forces under the command of John Pascoe Grenfell blockaded and bombarded Belém and, on May 10, Angelim fled from the capital, and was captured and detained. Meanwhile, contrary to what Soares Andréia imagined, the resistance did not end with the detention of Angelim. For three years, the rebels continued to resist from the interior of the province, but were gradually destroyed. The conflict finally ended when amnesty was declared to the rebels in 1839. In 1840 the last rebel group, under the leadership of Gonçalo Jorge de Magalhães, yielded.

== Legacy ==
It is estimated that during the five years of fighting in the revolt, the population of Pará was reduced from about 100,000 to 60,000.

In homage to the Cabano movement the Memorial da Cabanagem designed by Oscar Niemeyer was erected in the entrance to the city of Belém. It was inaugurated January 7, 1985 as part of a celebration of 150 years since the Cabanagem. The monument has held the remains of key Cabano leaders Eduardo Angelem and Canon Batista Campos. Also housed within are symbolic ashes representing three additional leaders including Felix Clemente Malcher.
