= Battle of Arroyo Hondo =

Part of the Paraguayan War

- Part of the Humaitá campaign
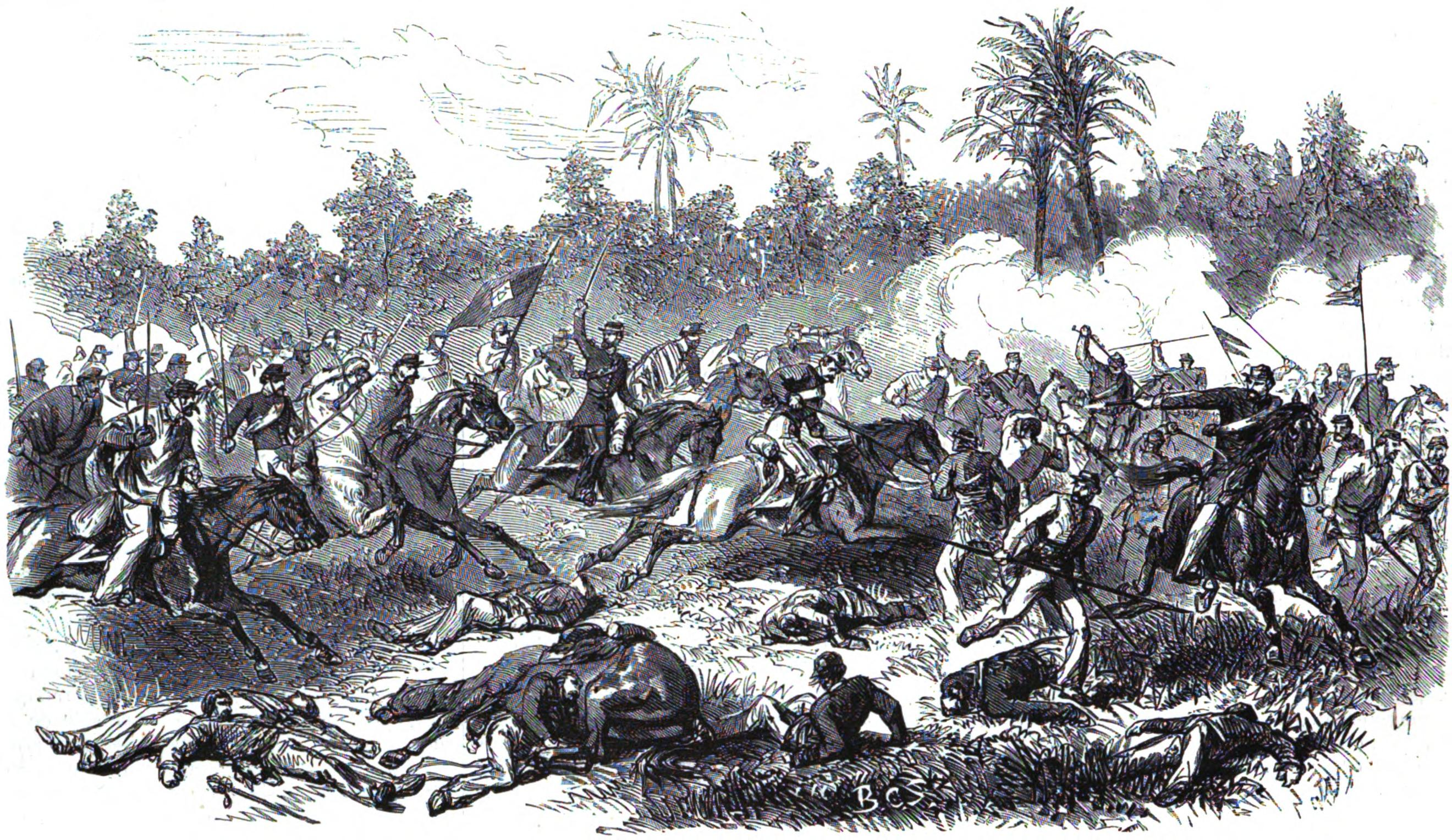
- Brazilian cavalry charge led by Gen. Andrade Neves, baron of Triunfo (L'Illustration, 1867).
Date	August 3, 1867
Location	Manduvirá River, Paraguay
Result	Brazilian victory

Belligerents
Empire of Brazil	Paraguay

Commanders and leaders
Andrade Neves	Eustacio Rojas

The Battle of Arroio Hondo, also known as Combat of Penimbu or Puru-Hué (Peru-Huê), took place on 3 August 1867, during the Paraguayan War.

== The battle ==
Some months before the Passage of Humaitá, the Triple Alliance War was mostly stalled, lacking in decisive actions, something brought by in great part due to the Allied defeat in the Battle of Curupayty. Momentum was, however, still in the hands of the Allies, who occupied part of Southern Paraguay and, better equipped, supplied and in greater numbers, were poised to strike at Asunción if they could overcome the Fortress of Humaitá.

In the Penimbu region within Paraguay, some tens of kilometers away from Humaitá, a column of Paraguayan troops under the leadership of Commander Eustacio Rojas was attacked, in a cavalry charge, by a unit of the Brazilian Guarda Nacional under the command of Brigadier Andrade Neves. After the attack, the Paraguayan troops fled, being pursued to Posta Chuchu.

The engagement, which took place on August 3, 1867, is also known by the alternative names Combat of Penimbu and Combat of Puru-Hué (or Peru-Huê). It formed part of the broader Humaitá campaign, during which Andrade Neves led several operations in the Penimbu region. Andrade Neves, a veteran of the Ragamuffin War and the Platine War, was one of the most prominent Brazilian cavalry commanders of the Paraguayan War, and was made Baron of Triunfo on October 19, 1867, shortly after this engagement.
