= Barão do Triunfo =

Municipality of Rio Grande do Sul, Brazil

- Municipality
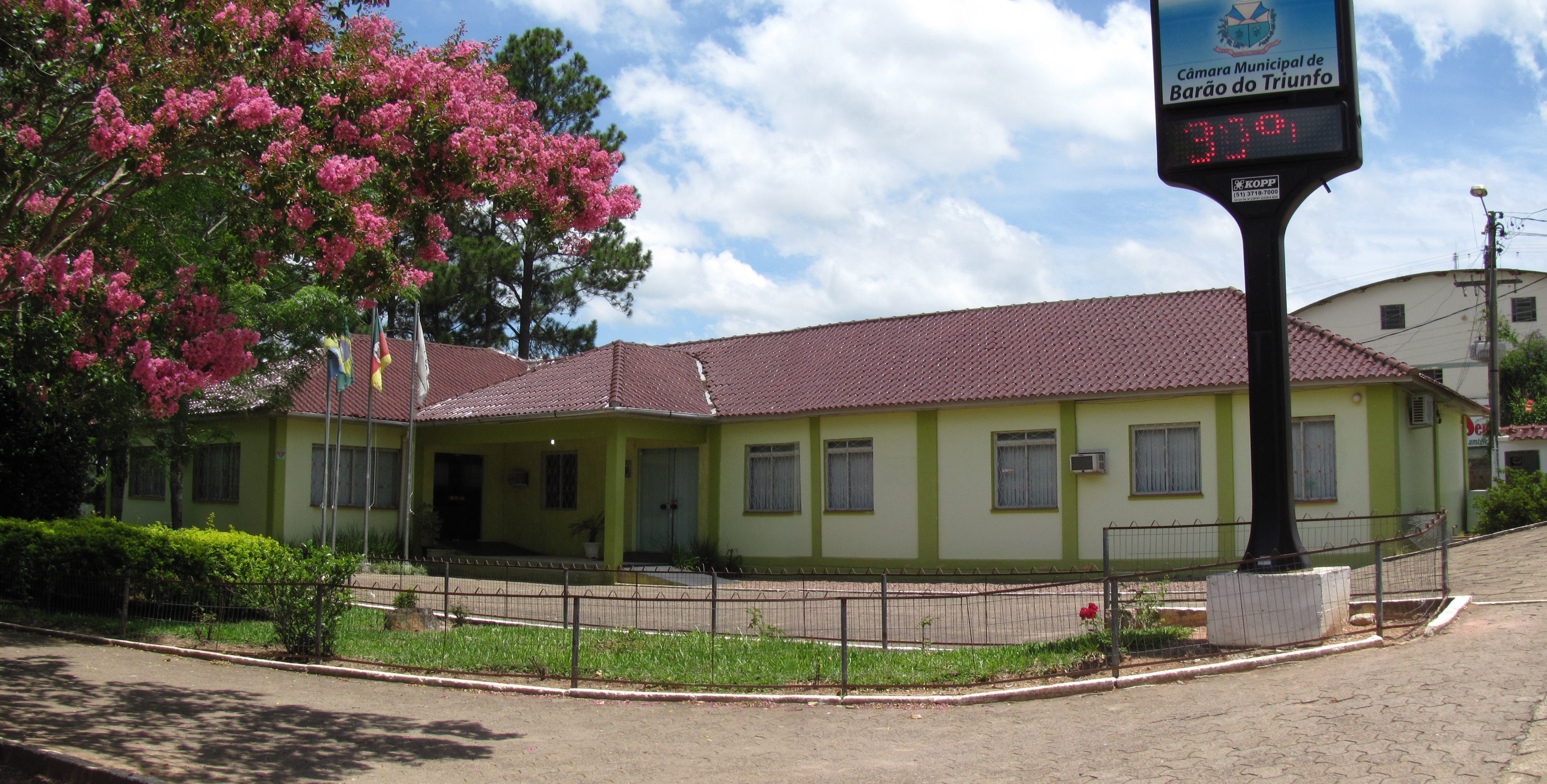
- Municipal Chamber of Barão do Triunfo

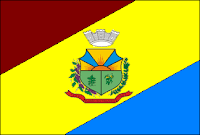
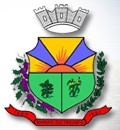
- Flag Coat of arms

- Location within Rio Grande do Sul

- Location in Brazil
- Coordinates: 30°23′S 51°44′W
- Country: Brazil
- State: Rio Grande do Sul

Population (2020)
  - Total: 7,519
- Time zone: UTC−3 (BRT)

Barão do Triunfo is a municipality in the state of Rio Grande do Sul, Brazil, named after Joaquim de Andrade Neves, Baron of Triunfo.

== See also ==
- List of municipalities in Rio Grande do Sul
