= Brazilian frigate Nichteroy =

Brazilian naval vessel (1823–1836)

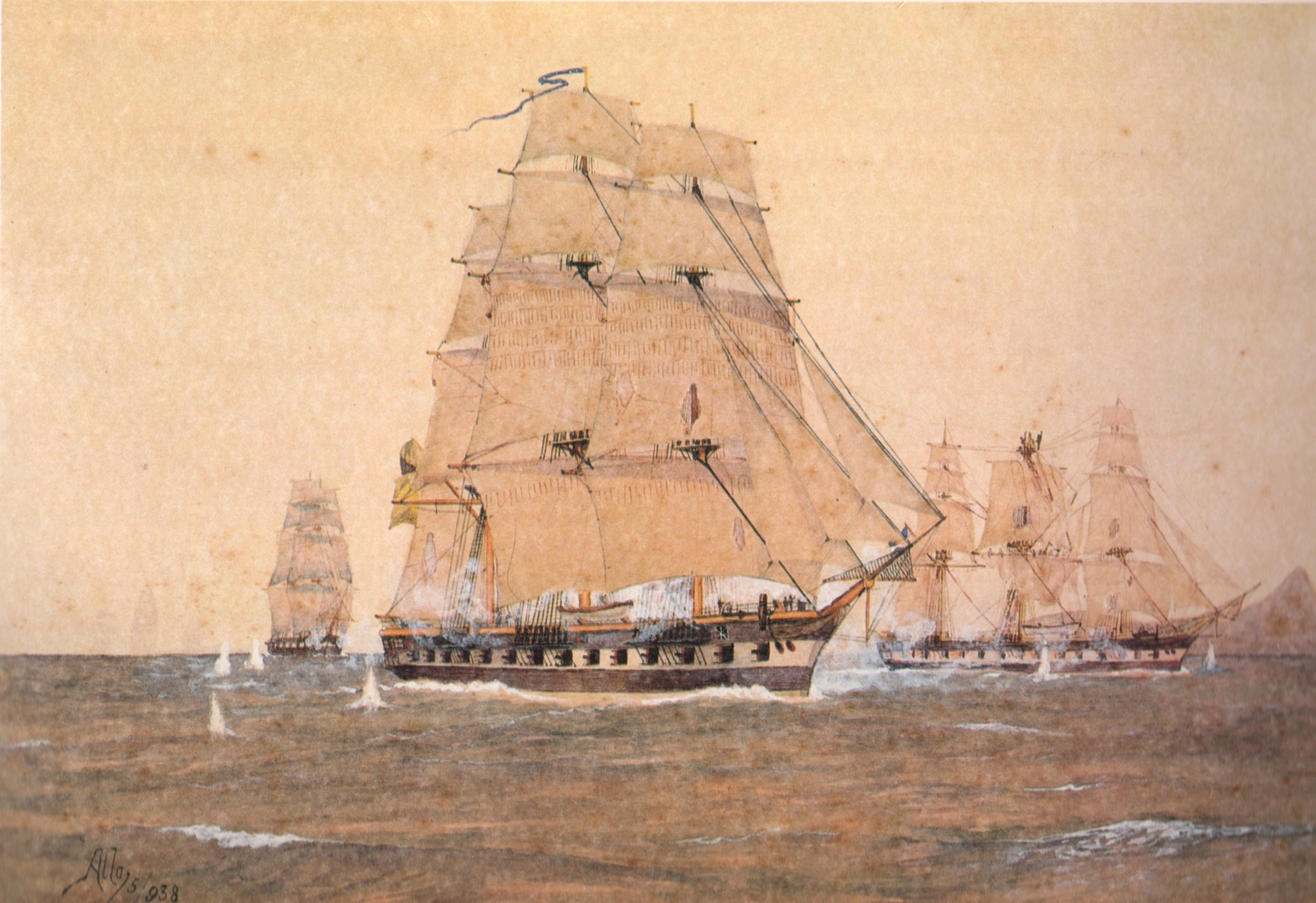
- The Niterói (center) attacks the 25 de Mayo (right), by Trajano Augusto de Carvalho, 1938

History

U.K. of Portugal, Brazil and the Algarves
- Name: Sucesso
- Namesake: Success
- Acquired: 1818
- Fate: Joined Brazil, 1823

Empire of Brazil
- Name: Nichteroy
- Namesake: Niterói
- Commissioned: 1823
- Decommissioned: 1836
- Fate: Scrapped

General characteristics
- Type: Fifth-rate frigate
- Sail plan: Full-rigged ship
- Complement: 400
- Armament: 36 cannons

Nichteroy (Note: The old spelling of Niterói was Nictheroy, but sources point to the ship's name being spelled as Nichteroy instead.) was a fifth-rate frigate of the Imperial Brazilian Navy, having been built as a British vessel, acquired by Portugal and later joining the Brazilian cause during the Brazilian War of Independence.

== History ==
The ship took part in the naval battle of 4 May off Salvador, where she sailed under the English-born frigate captain John Taylor and became notorious for chasing the fleeing Portuguese fleet across the Atlantic to the mouth of the Tagus. Later, the vessel sailed under captain of sea and war James Norton in the Cisplatine War, being Norton's flagship in the action of 11 April 1826 and in the battle of Lara-Quilmes, where she took William Brown's frigate 25 de Mayo out of action, which eventually led to its sinking.

The vessel was officially decommissioned in 1836, after years of serving as a hulk in the port of Rio de Janeiro.

== See also ==
- List of historical ships of the Brazilian Navy
