= Menotti Garibaldi =

Italian politician and general

Domenico Menotti Garibaldi
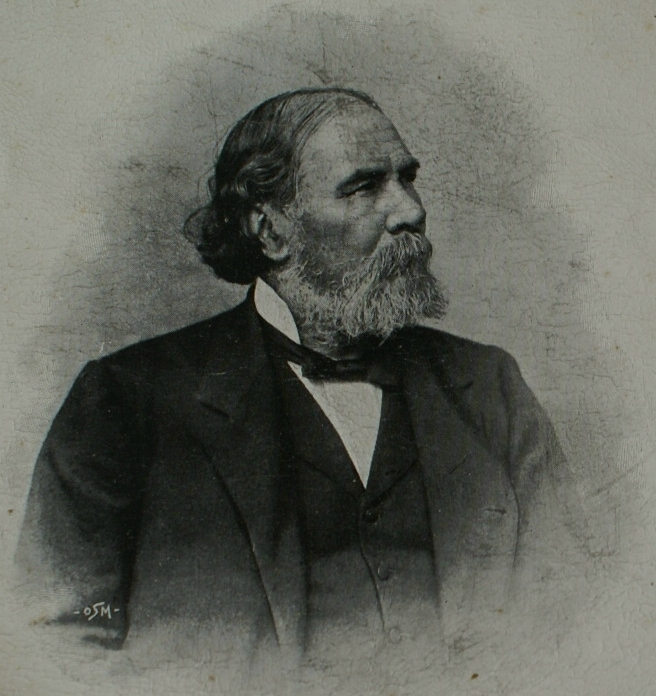
- Born: 16 September 1840; Mostardas, Riograndense Republic
- Died: 22 August 1903 (aged 62); Rome, Kingdom of Italy
- Relatives: Giuseppe Garibaldi (father); Anita Garibaldi (mother)
- Military career
- Allegiance: Kingdom of Sardinia; Kingdom of Italy (French Third Republic) French Republic
- Rank: General
- Units: Hunters of the Alps; Army of the Vosges
- Conflicts: Second Italian War of Independence; Expedition of the Thousand; Battle of Aspromonte; January Uprising; Third Italian War of Independence; Battle of Mentana; Franco-Prussian War

Domenico Menotti Garibaldi (16 September 1840 – 22 August 1903) was an Italian soldier and politician who was the eldest son of Giuseppe Garibaldi and Anita Garibaldi. He fought in the Second and Third wars of Italian Independence, and organized the Garibaldi Legion, a unit of Italian volunteers who fought for Polish independence in the January Uprising of 1863. He also served in the Italian Chamber of Deputies.

== Biography ==
Garibaldi was born on 16 September 1840 in Mostardas, in Rio Grande do Sul, southern Brazil, to Anita and Giuseppe Garibaldi, as their first son and the only born in Brazil. At the time of his birth Mostardas was part of the revolutionary Riograndense Republic, for which his parents were fighting in the Ragamuffin War. He was named after his grandfather, Domenico Garibaldi, and the Italian patriot Ciro Menotti, whom Giuseppe Garibaldi considered a martyr.

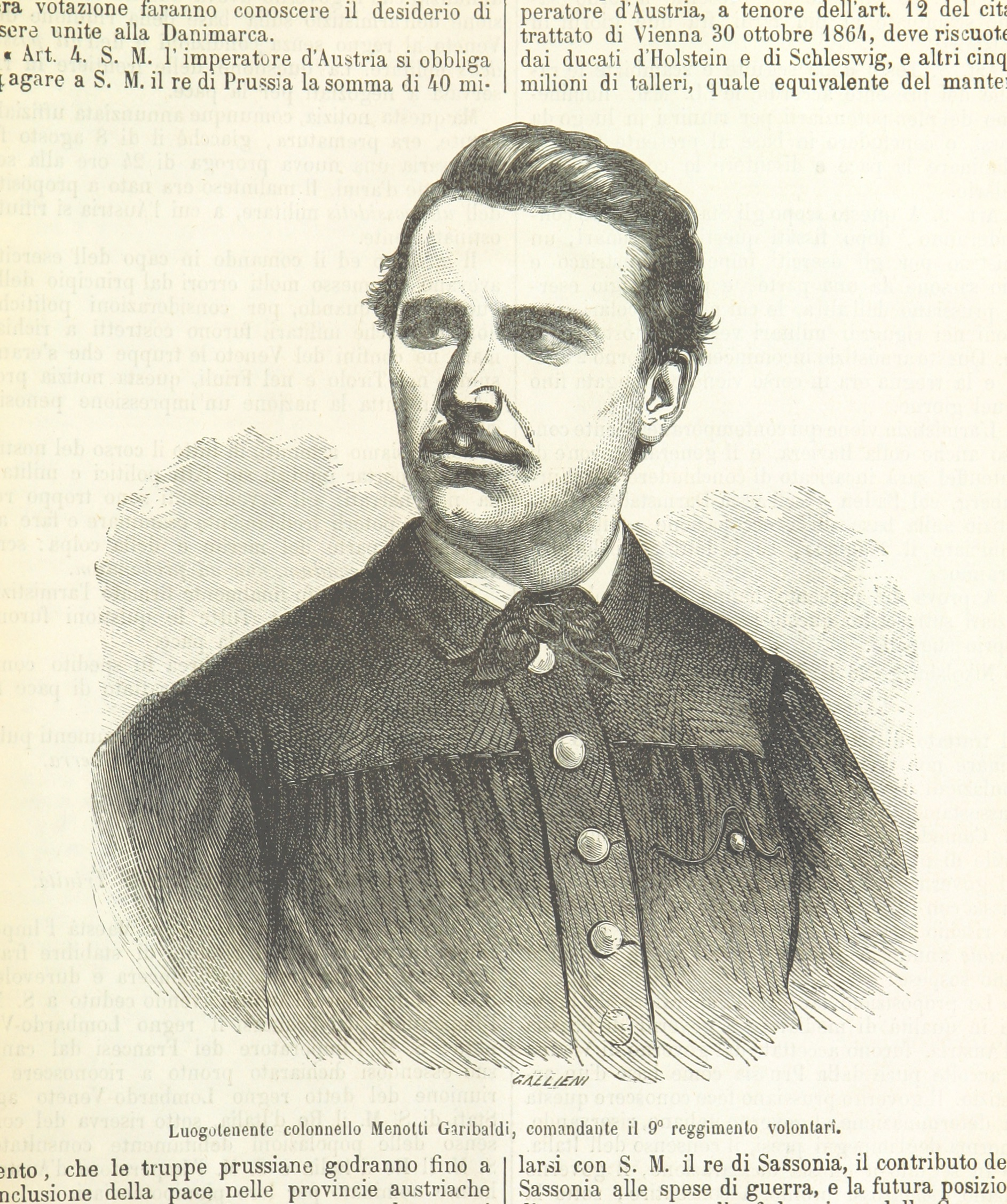
Menotti Garibaldi as a lieutenant colonel, c. 1866

After Anita's death in 1849, Garibaldi had a mixed upbringing, alternating between his paternal grandmother and Augusto Garibaldi, a cousin of his father, in Nice (then part of the Kingdom of Sardinia), then at his father’s home in Caprera after 1856. He was partly educated at a military school in Genoa. In 1859, aged 19, Garibaldi joined his father's newly formed legion of Redshirts, the Hunters of the Alps, created to assist Sardinia against Austria in the Second Italian War of Independence. He took part in the Expedition of the Thousand against the Kingdom of the Two Sicilies, in 1860, during which he was wounded at the Battle of Calatafimi. In late May, Garibaldi was sent to watch the surrender of Sicilian general Ferdinando Lanza after the Siege of Palermo.

In August 1862, he was present at the controversial Battle of Aspromonte, when both Menotti and Giuseppe Garibaldi were wounded in an attack by Italian troops. In 1863, during the January Uprising in Poland, Garibaldi organized a legion of Italian volunteers, the Garibaldi Legion, led by General Francesco Nullo, to support the Polish insurgents in the military struggle against the Russian Empire. He accompanied his father in a trip to London in 1864. Two years later, during the Third Italian War of Independence, Garibaldi fought alongside his brother Ricciotti, father and brother-in-law at the Battle of Bezzecca, which resulted in a victory over the Austrians. His own military skill was recognised in 1867, when his father asked him to lead volunteers in an invasion of the Papal States, which ended in defeat at the Battle of Mentana.

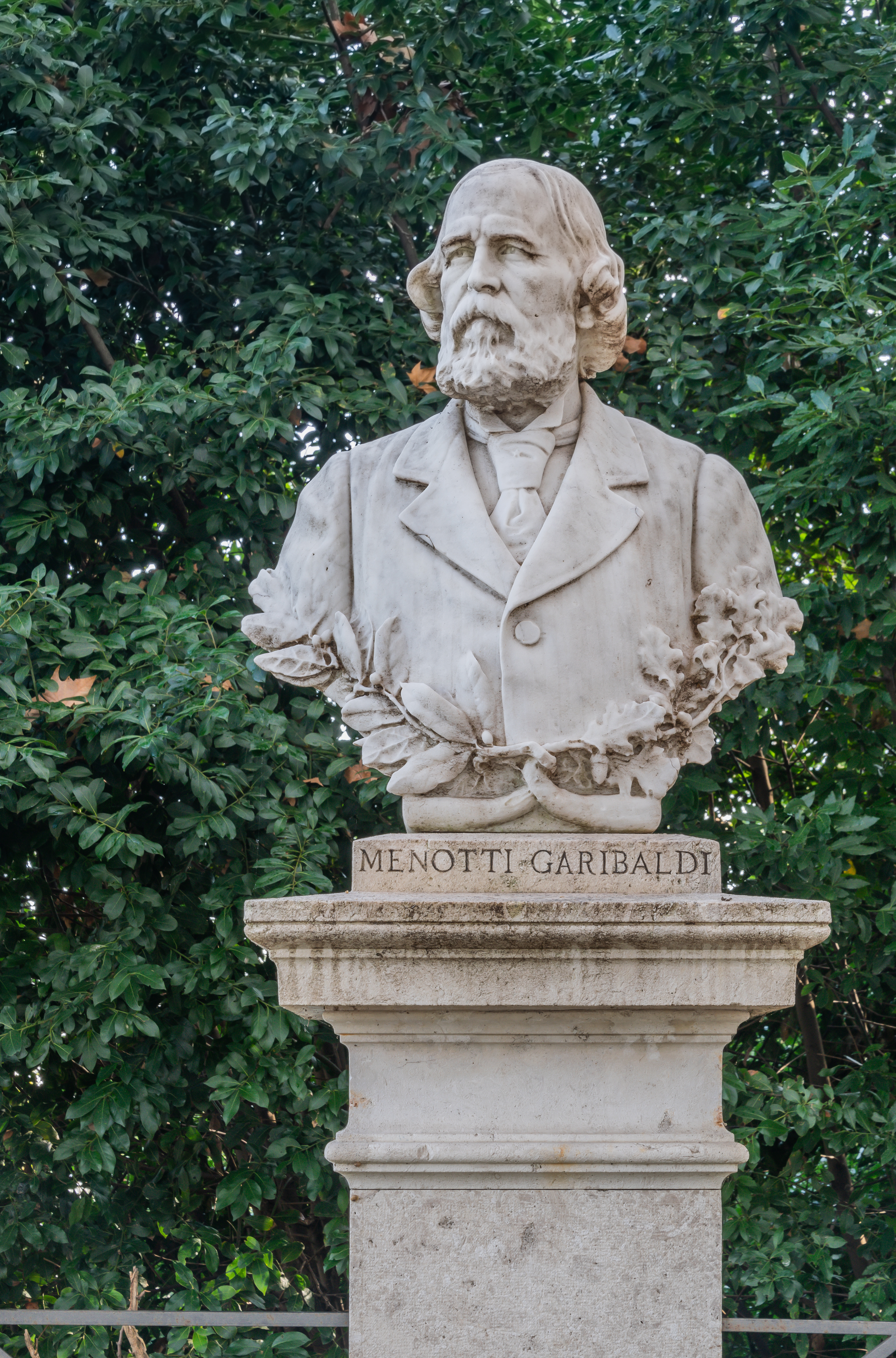
Bust in the Janiculum, Rome

With the unification of Italy, Garibaldi was made a general in the new Royal Italian Army. In the Franco-Prussian War of 1870–1871, he fought for France as commander of the 3rd brigade of the Army of the Vosges, a volunteer force led by his father, and served at the Third Battle of Dijon. After the war Garibaldi was elected to the Chamber of Deputies, and tried to raise an Italian legion to support the ʻUrabi revolt in Egypt. He died in Rome on 22 August 1903.

== Family tree ==
Giuseppe Garibaldi	Ana Maria de Jesus Ribeiro da Silva
Domenico Menotti Garibaldi	Rosa "Rosita" Garibaldi	Teresa "Teresita" Garibaldi	Ricciotti Garibaldi	Harriet Constance Hopcraft
Peppino Garibaldi	Costante Garibaldi	Anita Italia Garibaldi	Ezio Garibaldi	Bruno Garibaldi	Ricciotti Garibaldi Jr.	Menotti Garibaldi Jr.	Sante Garibaldi

== See also ==
- Ricciotti Garibaldi

== Bibliography ==
- Marco Formato, Menotti Garibaldi. Un eroe di due mondi, Paolo Sorba Editore (2015).
- Antonio Fappani, La Campagna garibaldina del 1866 in Valle Sabbia e nelle Giudicarie, Brescia 1970.
