= Tagliafico =

Tagliafico is an Italian surname. Notable people with the surname include:

- Nicolás Tagliafico (born 1992), Argentine footballer
- Santo Tagliafico (1756–1829), Italian painter
