= Compendio Garibaldino =

Museum in Caprera, Sardinia

Coordinates: 41.2165°N 9.4612°E

- View of the house

General information
- Architectural style: Vernacular
- Location: Caprera, Sardinia
- Completed: 1856; 170 years ago
- Owner: Ministero della Cultura

The Compendio Garibaldino is an area of Caprera, Sardinia, known for being the residence of Giuseppe Garibaldi. The Compendio consists of Garibaldi's main residence, the gardens and stables, and the Garibaldi Family tombs, where Garibaldi, along with his third wife Francesca, and several of his children are buried. Since 2014 the museum has been run by the Ministry of Culture.

== History ==
The Compendio in circa 1860

Garibaldi first landed in Caprera on 25 September 1849, while coming from Tunis. Garibaldi bought the land in 1855 thanks to a bequest left by his brother. In 1856 Garibaldi began renovating the small house located on the land, along with his son Menotti and some friends. Intending for the house to become the family home, Garibaldi had a small wooden home come in from Nice. During the summer of 1856 his children Teresita and Ricciotti joined him at Caprera.

After the restoration work on the temporary residence was completed, construction began on the actual family home, which would later be called the Casa Bianca (“White House”). Here Garibaldi lived with his children, his last wife Francesca Armosino, and several close friends. He devoted himself to sheep farming and agriculture until his death which occurred in the house on 2 June 1882. Against Garibaldi's wishes, his body was buried in the garden of the home, where it is still located. After his death the house was still inhabited by his family, the last resident being Clelia Garibaldi, his daughter, who died aged 92 in 1959. Following her death the house became a museum in 1978.

== Description ==
Caprera. Plan of Garibaldi's residence. 1) Mill and olive press. 2) First house inhabited by the general. 3) Wooden house. 4) Storehouses. 5) Stable. 6) "Iron House". 7) Boat shed. 8) White House. 9) Old oven. 10) First windmill. 11) Tomb.

The Compendio Garibaldino is arranged around a central courtyard, onto which the Casa Bianca and the other buildings forming the farm face. In the center of the courtyard stands Clelia's tree, a pine tree that Garibaldi planted in 1867 on the occasion of the birth of his daughter Clelia.

=== The Casa Bianca ===
Garibaldi's residence is a simple building made of granite. The west-facing façade has an arched portal. The original core of the house, expanded twice in 1861 and in 1880, has a square floor plan, with a series of rooms and a staircase which leads to a terrace. The interior preserves many of Garibaldi's personal belongings, including furniture, photographs, weapons, paintings, clothing, books, and other memorabilia. The rooms include the former bedrooms of Garibaldi and members of his family, the kitchen, a memorabilia room, and the room where Garibaldi died in 1882. His deathbed and several other objects associated with his final days are preserved in the latter room.

=== Other buildings ===
In addition to the Casa Bianca, the Compendio Garibaldino includes several other historic buildings associated with Giuseppe Garibaldi and his life on Caprera. These include his first residence on the island, consisting of the restored hut and the small wooden house brought from Nice and reassembled on Caprera. The complex also includes the so-called “Iron House”, a prefabricated wooden structure covered with iron sheeting that was donated to Garibaldi in 1861 and used to house his library. A former stable contains agricultural and other objects used by Garibaldi, as well as the tomb of Garibaldi's favourite horse, Marsala. The complex also includes a mill, an oven, and a monumental marble bust of Garibaldi sculpted by Luigi Bistolfi in 1883 and placed overlooking the ocean.

=== Cemetery ===
Tombs of the Garibaldi Family

A path from the central courtyard leads to the Garibaldi family cemetery, where Garibaldi is buried beneath a large boulder bearing his surname. He is buried alongside his last wife, Francesca Armosino, and several of their children, including Rosa, Manlio, and Clelia. The cemetery also contains the graves of Teresita, Garibaldi's daughter by Anita Garibaldi, and Anna Maria, known as Anita, his daughter with Battistina Ravello. Garibaldi's tomb was continuously guarded by an honor guard detachment of the Italian Navy for a century, from his death in 1882 until 1982.
