= Army of the Vosges =

- Armée des Vosges
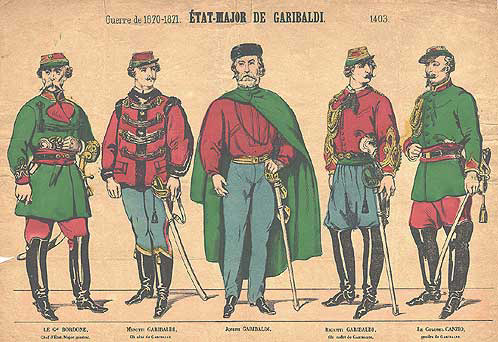
- Garibaldi's staff
- Active: October 1870 – March 1871
- Allegiance: French Third Republic
- Type: Infantry
- Size: 2,000+ • 1,500 Greeks • 500 Italians • Smaller number of Poles, Spaniards, Swiss and British
- Engagements: Franco-Prussian War; Battle of Dijon

Commanders
- Notable commanders: Giuseppe Garibaldi; Józef Hauke-Bosak; Louis Delpech; Menotti Garibaldi; Ricciotti Garibaldi

The Army of the Vosges (French: Armée des Vosges) was a volunteer force placed under the command of Giuseppe Garibaldi, formed in order to ensure the defense of the road to Lyon from the Prussian Army during the Franco-Prussian war.

== Background ==
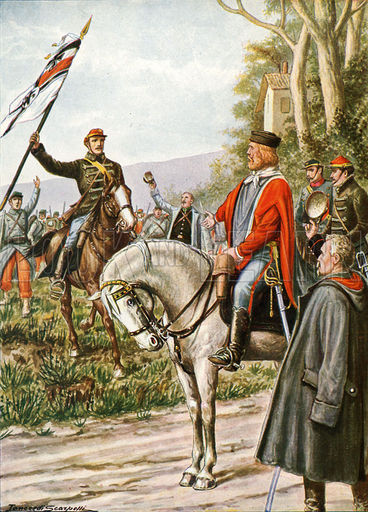
Garibaldi at Dijon with Northern Confederation flag

Garibaldi had led volunteer forces with great success during the unification of Italy, and had also fought in South America. He had a worldwide reputation as a liberal revolutionary.

Most Italians including Garibaldi had supported Prussia against France in this war. However, after Napoleon III was defeated and the French Third Republic was proclaimed, and Bismarck demanded the cession of Alsace, Italian opinion reversed completely. This was best exemplified by the reaction of Garibaldi, who told the Movimento of Genoa on 7 September 1870 that "Yesterday I said to you: war to the death to Bonaparte. Today I say to you: rescue the French Republic by every means." Subsequently, Garibaldi wrote a letter to the government of the new republic offering, "what is left of me." The French were reluctant at first to accept his offer, "but help from such a distinguished source could not be rejected."

Garibaldi arrived in Marseille on November 7, 1870, to a cool reception. The French commanders were unsure of the wisdom in bringing on Garibaldi, as well as harboring old feelings of distrust, as they had been enemies until just a short time previously. Garibaldi was initially put in charge of a few hundred Italian volunteers, but after much arguing took command of 5,000-15,000 men.

== Organization ==
The Army of the Vosges was a part of the French Third Republic Army that was made up primarily of volunteers. The volunteers included primarily of 1.500 Greeks, 500 Spaniards but also Poles, English, Scotts, Italians, Irish and from America. The Army also included Frenchmen who were loyal to their country, but uninterested in the constraints that joining the regular army would have brought about. These men were often members of a francs-tireur, guerrilla forces that fought outside the scope of the regular army.

The Army was organized into four brigades, "the first commanded by General Bossack, the second by Colonel Delpeck… and the third by Menotti [Garibaldi, Giuseppe's son]." The fourth brigade was under the command of Ricciotti Garibaldi, another of Giuseppe's sons. The chief of staff for the Army of the Vosges was General Bordone, the man largely responsible for Garibaldi going to France. Among other things, Bordone was in charge of procuring any supplies that the Army might need.

== Campaign ==
On November 14, 1870, a force led by Ricciotti Garibaldi surprised a Baden force at Châtillon-sur-Seine, defeating them. Giuseppe issued an order of the day detailing this victory.

The francs-tireurs of the Vosges, the chasseurs of the Isère, the (Savoyard) chasseurs of the Alps, the battalion of the Doubs, and the Hâvre chasseurs, all of whom, under the direction of Ricciotti Garibaldi, have taken part in the affair at Châtillon, have deserved well of the Republic.
Being 400 strong, they attacked and defeated them, Italians reported that they made 167 prisoners (including 13 officers), and took eighty-two saddled horses, four fourgons of arms and ammunition, and the mail waggon. On our side there were six men killed, and twelve wounded.
I commend the prisoners to the generosity of the French nation.

While this was great news to the army at large, it would prove to be a problem for Garibaldi's men. With such an astonishing victory over a superior force, the army developed a false sense of security.

For the rest of the Army of the Vosges, the campaign started a few days later in November 1870. The city of Dijon was under siege by the Prussian army, so Garibaldi and his men set out for Dijon, intent on helping the citizens defend their city. A few miles from the city, the army received word that the city had surrendered. Upon hearing the news, the army headed back towards Autun.

On the march back, Garibaldi began to consider returning to Dijon in an attempt to regain control from the Prussians. He felt that attacking at night would minimize the effect of the Prussian force. As the army headed towards Dijon, they passed through Lantenay, where, standing atop a plateau, they spotted a contingent of the Prussian army headed their way from Dijon. Garibaldi and his officers decided that this was their chance to make an impact. They prepared the field of battle to their advantage and waited. Once the Prussians were within range, the army began to fire on the Prussians, who, caught by surprise, fought for a moment then retreated. Sensing victory, Garibaldi pursued the retreating army all the way back to Dijon.

Arriving at Dijon with roughly 5,000 men Garibaldi attacked the Prussians that evening. The assault went on into the night; however, victory was not to be, and once again the Army of the Vosges retreated back to Autun. This time, the Prussians followed them.

The Prussians arrived at Autun and laid siege to the city. Just as it appeared that all hope was lost, General August von Werder recalled his troops to Dijon. General von Werder had noticed a buildup of French troops near Dijon and therefore wanted the army back to help defend the city. This was not to be however, as shortly after the arrival of the army to Dijon, in late December 1870, von Werder ordered that the city be evacuated.

With the Prussian army gone from Autun, the Army of the Vosges had precious time to recoup and recover. In addition to the rest, the time also gave the Army time to plan. It was decided that the Army, along with other French forces, would return to Dijon, now unoccupied, and hold the city once more. Due to the winter weather, getting the Army to Dijon took some time.

The battle for the Army of the Vosges resumed on January 21, 1871. The Prussians attacked Dijon from the west in great numbers; however, the French had been preparing and the defenses of the city were well in place. The two armies went back and forth for three days. Each time one army made headway, the opposing army would push back, gaining ground. On the fourth day, The Prussian army pulled back and the fighting ceased for a while.

The fighting renewed the next day and continued sporadically until January 31, 1871. At this point, the Army of the Vosges was tired and had taken many casualties. Because of this, the Army of the Vosges pulled out of Dijon and retreated to Corcelles-les-Monts. The Prussians once again held Dijon, beginning the morning of February 1, 1871.

== After the war ==
The French government surrendered Paris to the German army at the end of January 1871, and brought the war to a close. In February Garibaldi was elected to the French National Assembly as a representative of the Alpes-Maritimes department. Days later, however, after the Assembly refused to hear him when he wished to speak at the moment when the President had just adjourned the meeting, Garibaldi resigned his seat and as commander of the Army of the Vosges. He then returned to Caprera.
