= Gaetano Gallino =

Italian painter and photographer (1804–1884)

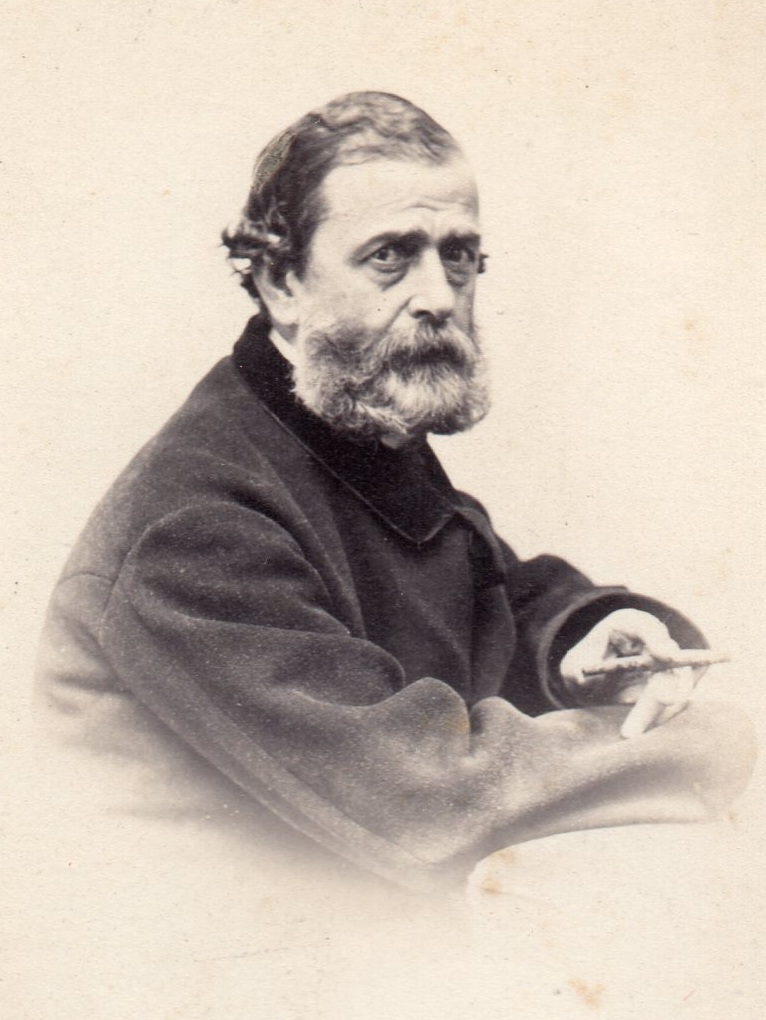
Self-portrait

Gaetano Gallino (11 February 1804 – 10 October 1884) was an Italian painter and photographer, born and trained in Genoa, but active for many years in Uruguay as a portrait artist.

He trained under Santo Tagliafichi in Genoa, and took courses at the Accademia ligustica di belle arti. Joining the Young Italy movement of Giuseppe Mazzini, he was forced into exile, fleeing to Montevideo, Uruguay. There he met, and painted portraits of Garibaldi and his wife Anita. He returned to Italy in 1848 to 1859, but returned to Uruguay during 1859 to 1864, when he finally returned to Genoa.
