= Battle of Dijon (1870) =

Series of battles in the Franco-Prussian War

Battles of Dijon
- Part of the Franco-Prussian War
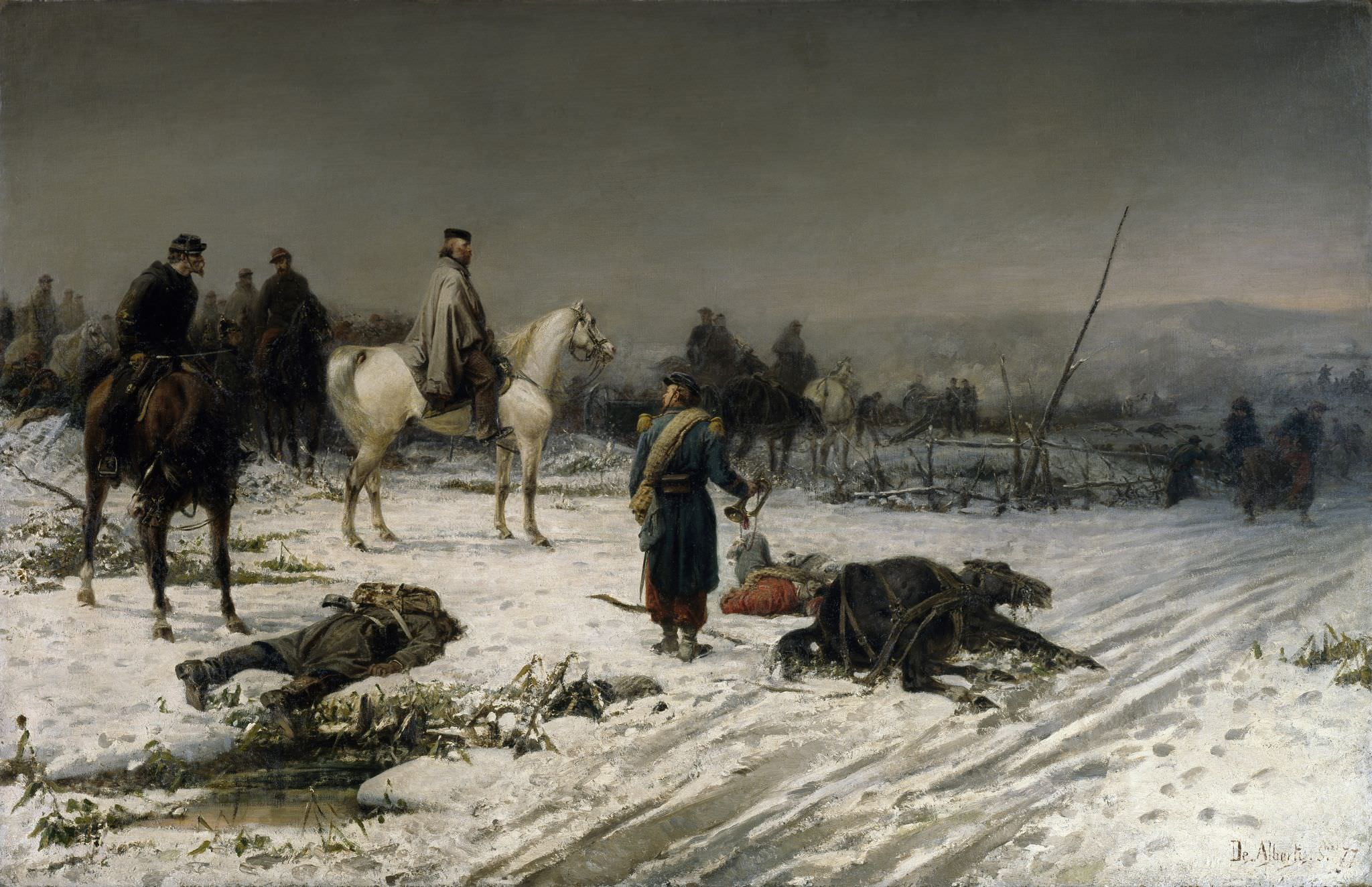
- Garibaldi in Dijon by Sebastiano De Albertis, 1877
Date	1st: 29–30 October 1870; 2nd: 18 December 1870; 3rd: 21–23 January 1871
Location	Dijon, France 47°19′N 5°02′E
Result	1st: Prussian victory 2nd: Prussian victory 3rd: French victory

Belligerents
French Republic	North German Confederation; Prussia Baden German Empire

Commanders and leaders
Giuseppe Garibaldi; Adrien François Louis Fauconnet †; Józef Hauke-Bosak †	August von Werder; Major General Von Kettlerr; Prince Wilhelm (WIA); Gustav von Beyer

Units involved
Army of the Vosges	61st Pomeranian Regiment

Strength
50,000 troops (third battle)	4,000 troops (third battle)

Casualties and losses
First battle: 100 killed 200 captured	First battle: 150 Killed and wounded Third battle: 700 killed and wounded 1 flag captured
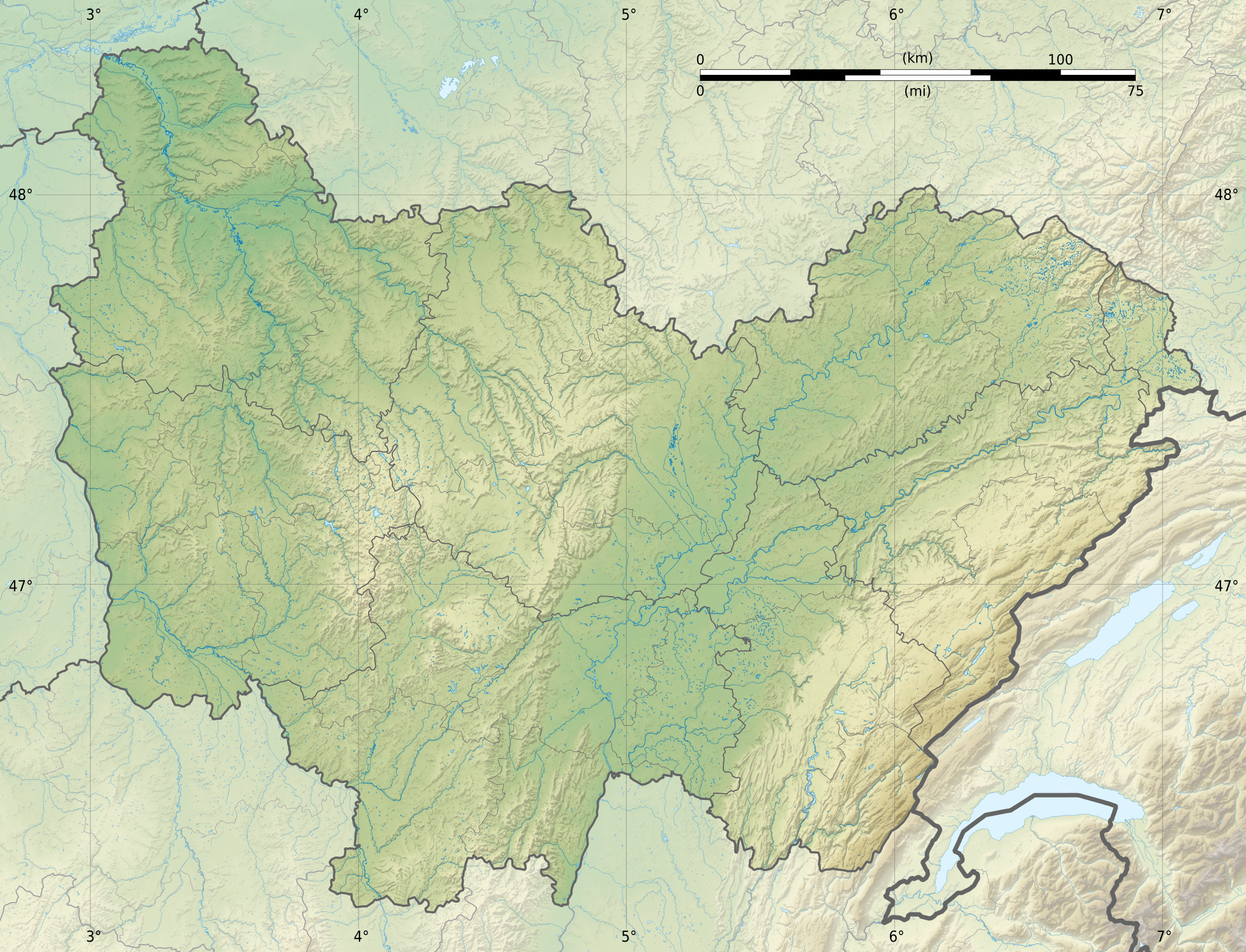
- Location within Bourgogne-Franche-Comté Battle of Dijon (1870) (France)

The Battles of Dijon were a series of battles that took place in 1870 and 1871, as part of the Franco-Prussian War, on the current territory of the French commune of Dijon between the French Republic and the German states of Prussia and Baden and later, the German Empire.

== Background ==
The Franco-Prussian War, which started on 19 July 1870, began with a rapid succession of French defeats: the evacuation of northern Alsace (with defeats at Wissembourg and Wörth), the capitulation of Marshal Bazaine in Metz at the Battle of Gravelotte, the defeat and capture of Emperor Napoleon III at the Battle of Sedan, and his capitulation on 2 September. The German armies invaded all of eastern France and opened up the road to Paris. The Republic was proclaimed on 4 September and the provisional government decided, under the impetus of Léon Gambetta, in charge of the new Government of National Defense, for the continuation of the war.

== First Battle of Dijon ==
From the start of the Siege of Paris (19 September 1870 – 20 January 1871), French strategy focused on harassing actions against Prussian troops established in the east of the country, to reduce pressure on the capital such as the Battles of Strasbourg and Metz. The troops still available in the east, supported by local defense committees raised after the defeats of the summer, were invited to start a "partisan war". Thus were born the corps of the francs-tireurs, corps of volunteers of variable entity, which in a few months would constitute, with the Italian Redshirts, the heart of the Giuseppe Garibaldi's Army of the Vosges. Their coordination with the rest of the regular troops was not at all easy and, from 11 September, the government sought to integrate them into the ranks of the regulars, with some setbacks.

After the capitulation of Sedan and while laying siege around Paris, the Prussians consolidated their conquests in the East. On 17 October, General Von Werder's troops occupied Luxeuil and Vesoul, and on the 26th Gray, and on the 27th they marched towards Dijon, barely delayed by the Garde Mobile who had positioned themselves to defend the passage of the Vingeanne. French Colonel Fauconnet's troops were forced to give up defending the town and fall back on Beaune. On the 29th, the prefect and the mayor of the city, under pressure from the population, demanded their return. Local volunteers engaged in combat against two brigades of the Baden army and vanguards of the Prussian Army.

The battle on 30 October was the very expression of the difficulties in applying a strategy and the deep disorganization of the French armed forces. The fighting continued all day through on the heights of Montmusard and in the eastern suburbs of Dijon, in particular in Jeannin Street. Colonel Adrien François Louis Fauconnet, returned from Beaune with a few thousand men and was seriously wounded there while he was attempting a counter-offensive on Gray Road, in front of the granting barrier, and died a few hours later, after having taken knowledge of the decree which appointed him general. Around five o'clock in the evening, the municipality had the white flag hoisted on the tower of the Palace, not without the man in charge of this mission having first suffered shots from supporters of the resistance to the extreme. After negotiations carried out overnight in Varois, the city was occupied the next day. One hundred and sixty combatants had given their lives to defend it.

== Second Battle of Dijon ==
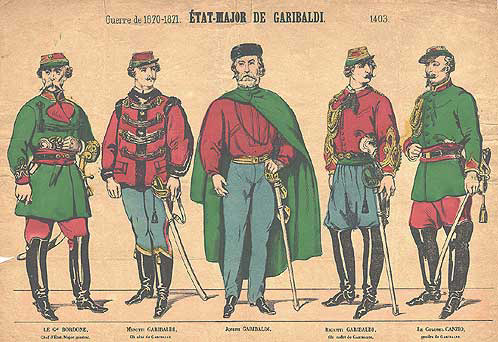
Garibaldi's staff

Meanwhile, Giuseppe Garibaldi arrived in Marseille on 7 October, to help the Republic which had succeeded the Second French Empire of Napoleon III, whose armies had defeated him in Rome in 1849 and at the Battle of Mentana in 1867. In mid-October, the general was charged by the provisional government to organize an army in the east of France (it is in Dole the 13 October). This mission was similar to that carried out between the Lombard lakes in 1848 and 1859, and to operations in Trentino in 1866: it involved action in a secondary area of operations but with a significant strategic role.

The army, which initially numbered less than 4,000 men, was made up of colonials, national guards from Aveyron, the Alpes-Maritimes and Savoie, Frankish corps (east and south-east of France), and foreign volunteers (Polish, Hungarian, Spanish, American and, above all, Italian). Garibaldi was assisted by his sons, Menotti and Ricciotti, his son-in-law Canzio, and Joseph Bordone, an Avignonnais of Italian origin who had followed Garibaldi in the Expedition of the Thousand, and who was promoted general and chief of staff for the occasion.

From the following month, Garibaldi set up his own headquarters in Autun, and began attacks on the Prussian army, disrupting supply lines from Strasbourg to Paris. He enjoyed some success from the victorious shock of Châtillon-sur-Seine on 19 November, when Ricciotti Garibaldi took 200 prisoners and captured convoys of arms and ammunition. On 26 November, however, the army failed in its attempt to retake Prussian-occupied Dijon.

The battle took place on 18 December, in the plain which extends in front of the town of Nuits-Saint-Georges, when the Germans made contact with the volunteers who barred their way to the south. After a day of fighting, the Frankish corps retreated, leaving around 1,200 French prisoners, 97 German officers shot dead, and Prince Wilhelm wounded, with overall losses amounting to a few hundred men. The Prussians captured fugitives on the roads of the village, except some survivors sheltered by the populace, who dressed them in civilian clothes. The victors looted the hospital, the shops, and the inns, set fire to buildings and sifted through the city house by house.

== Third Battle of Dijon ==
On 14 January 1871, Garibaldi settled in Dijon, which had been evacuated by the Prussians on 17 December after they were informed of the arrival (in the north) of French regular troops led by Charles-Denis Bourbaki. Bourbaki attempted an ambitious operation to relieve Paris by taking the enemy troops from the rear, through a vast strategic movement from Bourges to Alsace via Belfort. This desperate attempt followed two previous attacks led by the Army of the Loire and the Army of the North. Garibaldi then led, from Dijon, a series of initiatives to support the main offensive.

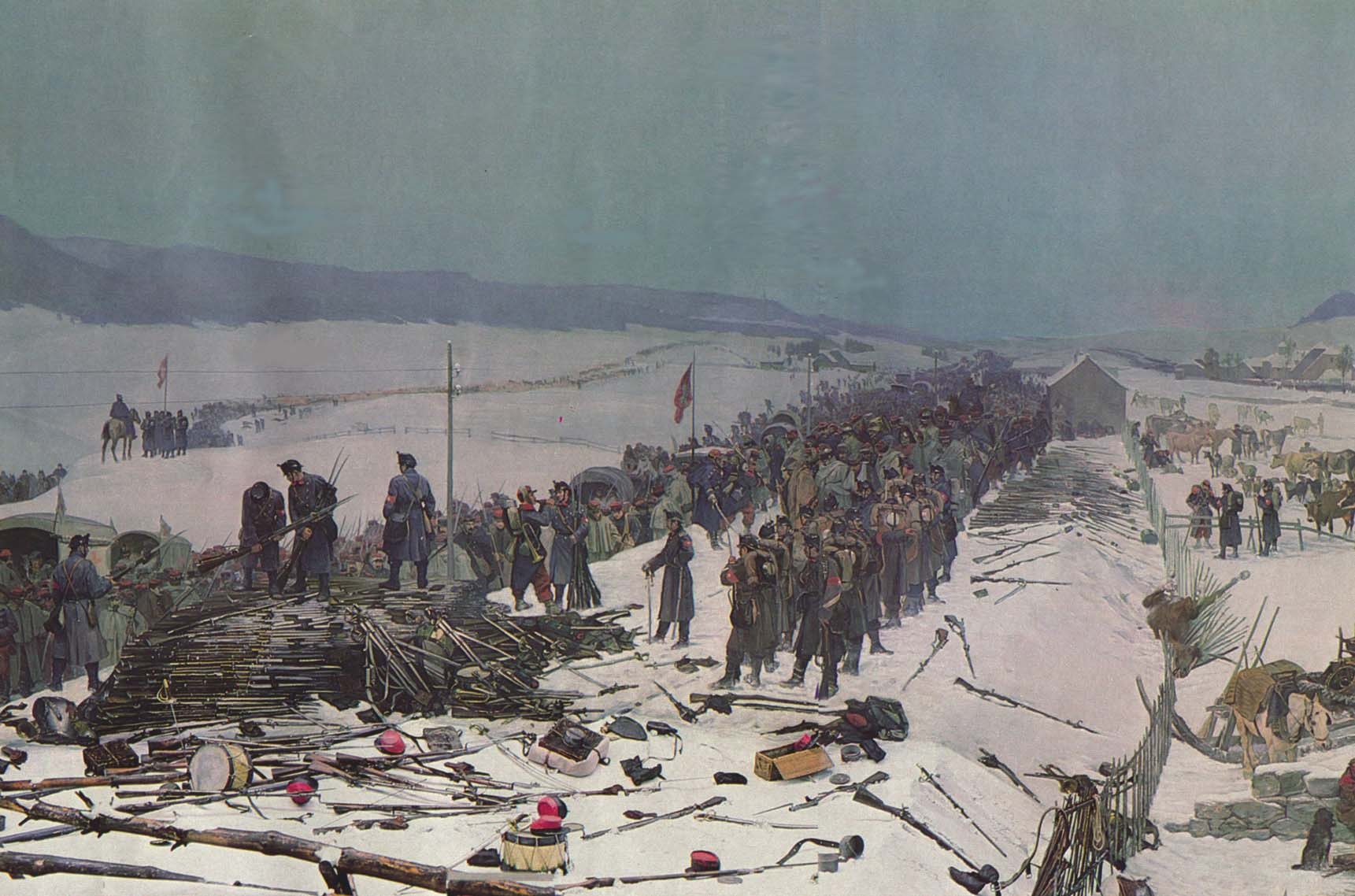
Bourbaki's army laying down their arms in Switzerland

In the meantime, the situation was coming to a head. The army of Paris failed in its efforts, while the retreat of Bourbaki towards Besançon was interrupted by the Germans of General Edwin von Manteuffel and pushed towards the Swiss border, mainly at Verrières-de-Joux on 31 January. The 84,000 men still in arms out of the 150,000 parties were disarmed and interned in the Confederation by the Verrières Convention.

Following the retreat of Bourbaki's main army, Garibaldi reduced his action to the defense of Dijon and the "gates of Burgundy", preventing the enemy from advancing south. On 21, 22 and 23 January, Dijon was attacked by 4,000 Prussians. Garibaldi emerged victorious and, on 23 January, captured a flag from the 61st Pomeranian Regiment. Polish General Józef Hauke-Bosak, who commanded the First Brigade, was killed during this battle.

== Aftermath ==
The provisional government began negotiations for the armistice, which was signed on 29 January. The armistice excluded the department of Dijon, as the Prussians wanting to humiliate Garibaldi and the corps of volunteers. Dijon remained occupied by the German army from 18 January until 28 October 1871.

On 8 March 1871, in front of a particularly stormy National Assembly which was hostile to Garibaldi, Victor Hugo thus celebrated Garibaldi's venture into Dijon:

Of all these European powers, none rose to defend this France which, so many times, had taken the cause of Europe in hand ... not a king, not a state, no one! Only one man except. Where the powers, as they say, didn't interfere, well a man stepped in, and that man is a power. This man, gentlemen, what did he have? His sword. [...] His sword, and this sword had already delivered one people ... And this sword could save another. He thought so; he came, he fought. Interruptions will not prevent me from completing my thought. He fought ... I don't want to hurt anyone in this Assembly, but I will say that he is the only one, of the generals who fought for France, the only one who was not defeated. [...] I ask to finish. [...] I will satisfy you, Gentlemen, and go further than you. Three weeks ago you refused to hear Garibaldi. Today you refuse to hear me. It's enough for me. I hand in my resignation[.]

== See also ==
- Battle of Mentana, an joint Franco-Baden's Papist forces engage with Red Shirts.

== Bibliography ==
- Alain Fauconnier, La Bataille de Nuits (roman historique), Editions de l'Armançon, 2012
- Scirocco, Alfonso (2011). Garibaldi, battaglie, amori, ideali di un cittadino del mondo (in Italian). Bari: Laterza. ISBN 978-88-420-8408-2.
