= Anita Garibaldi =

Brazilian revolutionary (1821–1849)

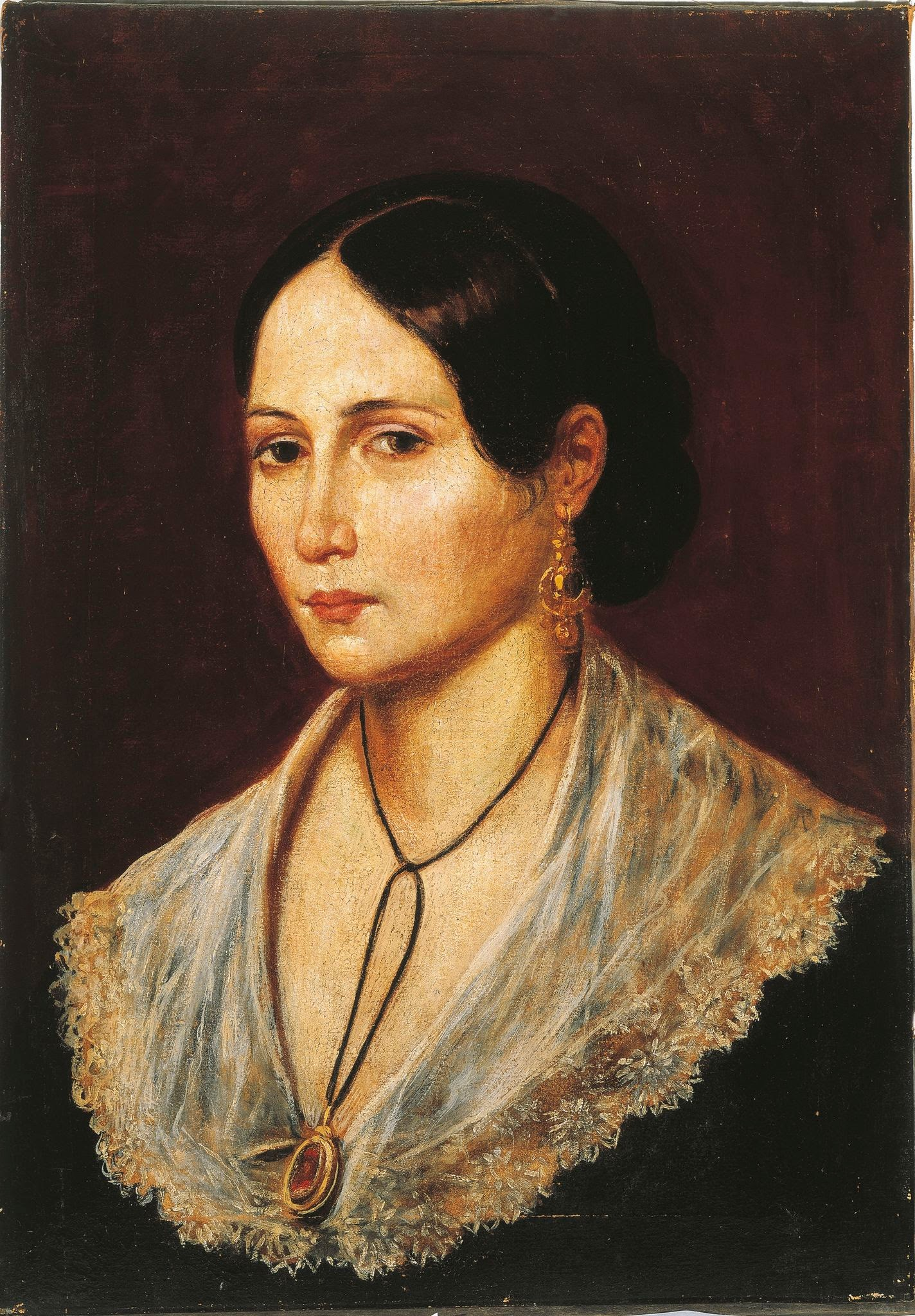
- Contemporary portrait of Anita by Gaetano Gallino, 1845
- Born: Ana Maria de Jesus Ribeiro; 30 August 1821; Laguna, Kingdom of Brazil
- Died: 4 August 1849 (aged 27); Ravenna, Papal States
- Burial place: Janiculum, Rome, Italy
- Spouses: Manuel Duarte Aguiar (m. 1835, abandoned); Giuseppe Garibaldi (m. 1842)
- Children: 4, including Menotti and Ricciotti
- Military career
- Allegiance: Juliana Republic; Roman Republic
- Conflicts: Ragamuffin War; Uruguayan Civil War; First Italian War of Independence

Anita Garibaldi (Brazilian Portuguese: [ɐˈnitɐ ɡaɾiˈbawdʒi], Italian: [aˈniːta ɡariˈbaldi]; born Ana Maria de Jesus Ribeiro; 30 August 1821 – 4 August 1849) was a Brazilian naturalized Italian republican revolutionary, who was the wife and comrade-in-arms of Italian revolutionary Giuseppe Garibaldi. Their partnership epitomized the spirit of the 19th century's Age of Romanticism and revolutionary liberalism.

== Early life ==
Ana Maria de Jesus Ribeiro was born on 30 August 1821, in Laguna, a part of the Kingdom of Brazil, a constituent kingdom of the United Kingdom of Portugal, Brazil and the Algarves – a year prior to the country's independence – into a poor family of Azorean Portuguese descent. She was the third of ten children born to Maria Antônia de Jesus Antunes and Bento Ribeiro da Silva, a tropeiro. In 1835, at the young age of fourteen years, Anita was forced to marry Manuel Duarte Aguiar, who abandoned her in order to join the Imperial Army.

== Life with Giuseppe Garibaldi ==
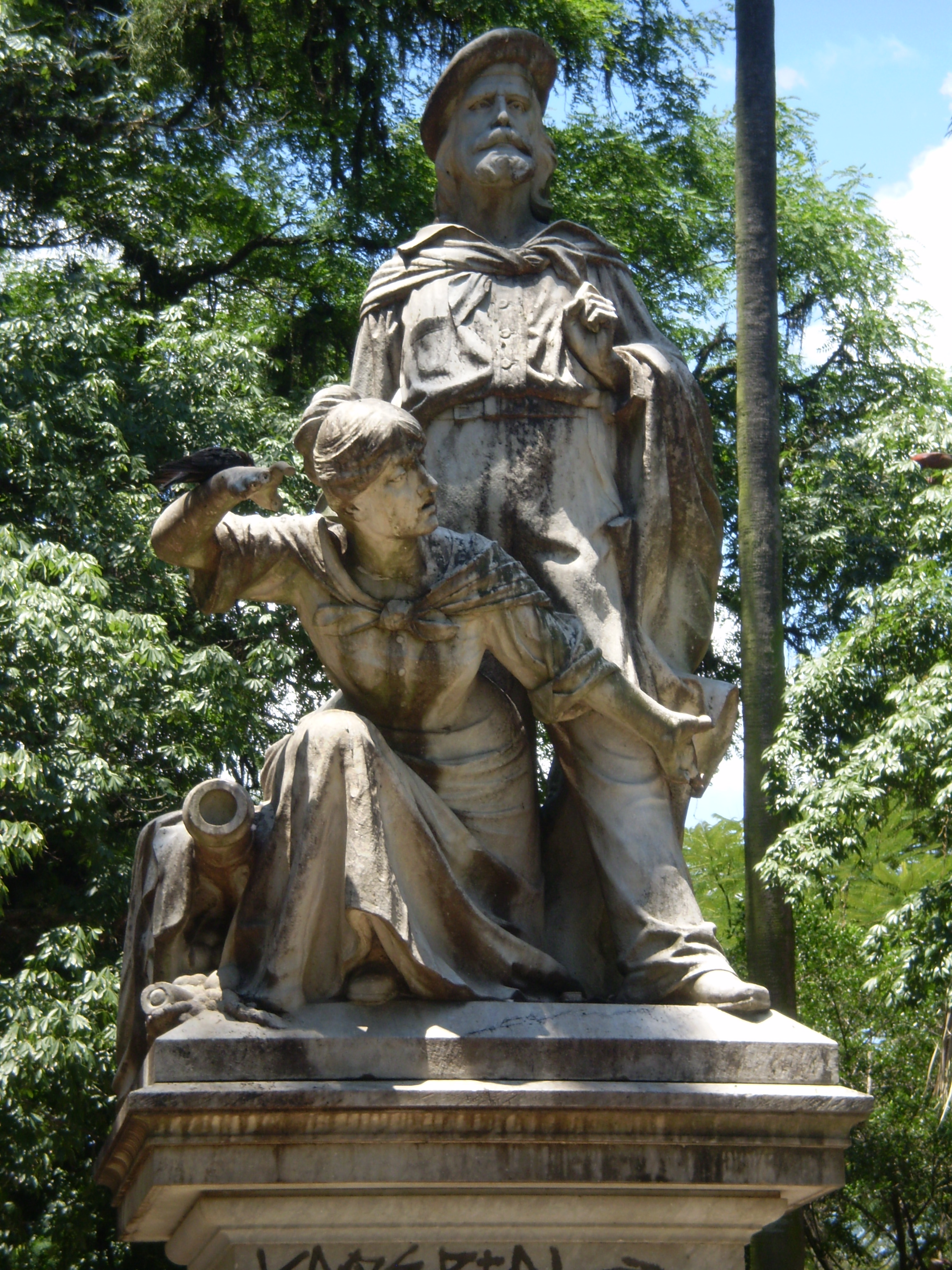
Anita and Giuseppe Garibaldi, memorialized in Praça Garibaldi, Azenha, Porto Alegre, Brazil

Giuseppe Garibaldi, a Niçois sailor of Ligurian descent turned Italian nationalist revolutionary, had fled Europe in 1836 and was fighting on behalf of the separatist Riograndense Republic in southern Brazil (the Ragamuffin War). When young Garibaldi first saw Anita, he could only whisper to her, "You must be mine." She joined Garibaldi on his ship, the Rio Pardo, in October 1839. A month later, she first saw action in battles at Imbituba and Laguna, fighting at the side of her lover.

A skilled horsewoman, Anita is said to have taught Giuseppe about the gaúcho culture of the Pampas of southern Brazil. One of Garibaldi's comrades described Anita as "an amalgam of two elemental forces…the strength and courage of a man and the charm and tenderness of a woman, manifested by the daring and vigor with which she had brandished her sword and the beautiful oval of her face that trimmed the softness of her extraordinary eyes."

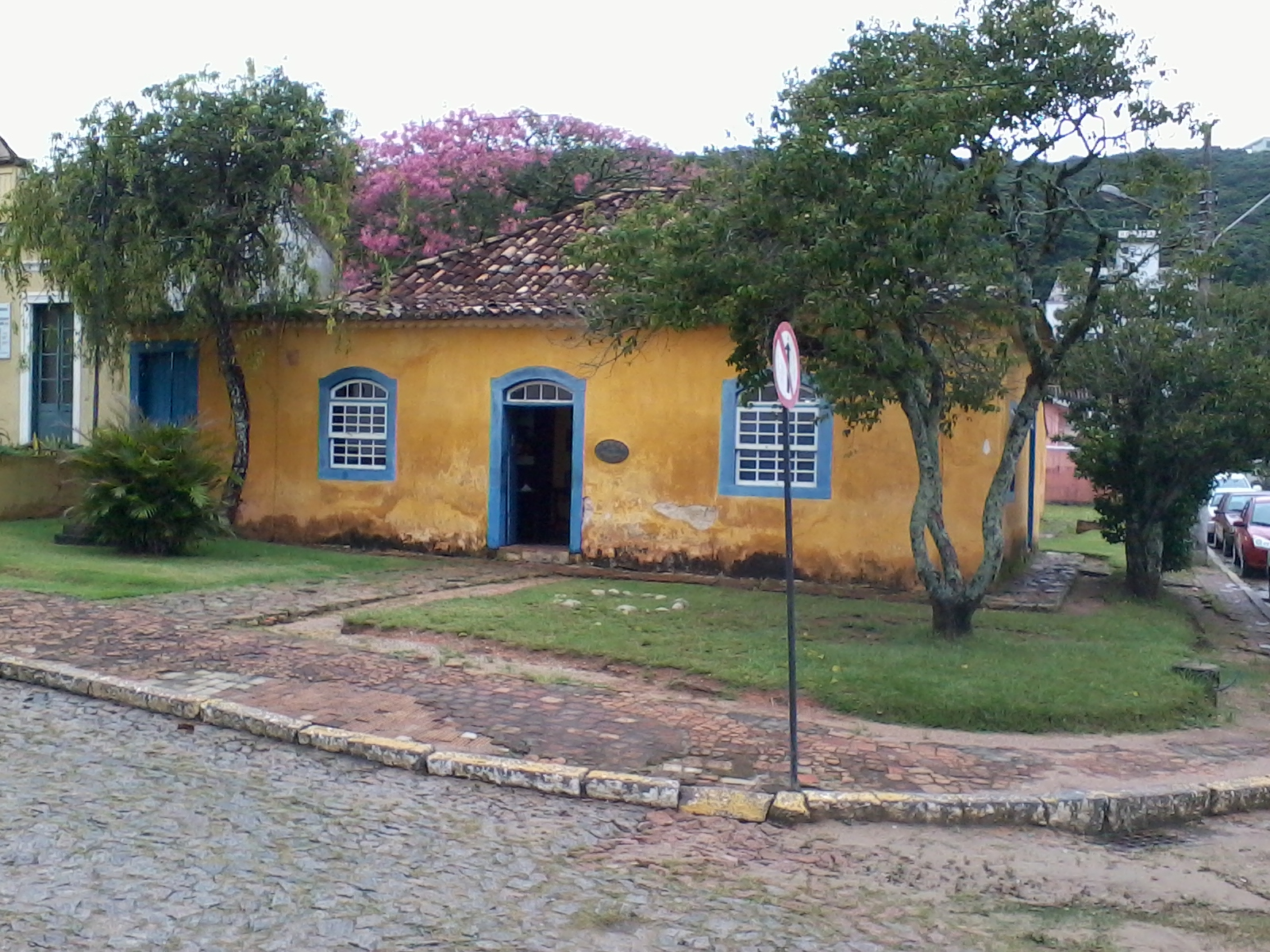
Anita's house in Laguna, Santa Catarina

At the Battle of Curitibanos, Garibaldi became separated from the front, losing contact with Anita, who was captured by the rival group. In captivity the guards told Anita that Garibaldi had died, at which Anita was very distraught, as much for her loved one as for her child they were expecting, whom Garibaldi was never going to see. Anita asked if she could search among the dead in battle. She was allowed to search, but did not find him. This gave hope to Anita, who, after a while, crept up on a camp horse, mounted it, and escaped at a gallop. The soldiers chased her. On the orders of her captors' superior, they were to return, dead or alive. They shot and killed her horse. Anita then came upon the river Canoas, into which she waded. The soldiers thought she would not survive and left her for dead. Anita spent four days wandering without food or drink in the woods, until she found a group of people who offered her food. Finally, she was able to contact the rebels and was reunited with Garibaldi in Vacaria. A few months later, their first child, Menotti (1840–1903), was born. He was born with a skull deformity due to a blow that Anita received when she fell from her horse in the flight from the Brazilian camp. Menotti also became a fighter for freedom and accompanied his father on his campaigns in Italy. His name was given in honor of Ciro Menotti. They had three more children born in Montevideo, Rosita (born 1843–1845), Teresita (born 1845–1903) and Ricciotti (born 1847–1924). Despite having some quarrels because Garibaldi was a womanizer, the truth is that it was a passionate love. In 1841, the couple moved to the Uruguayan capital of Montevideo, where Giuseppe Garibaldi worked as a trader and schoolmaster before taking command of the Uruguayan fleet in 1842 and raising an "Italian Legion" for that country's war against Argentine dictator Juan Manuel de Rosas. Anita participated in Garibaldi's 1847 defense of Montevideo against Argentina and his Uruguayan allied former president Manuel Oribe.

Anita and Giuseppe were married on 26 March 1842, in Montevideo.

== Campaign in Italy and death ==
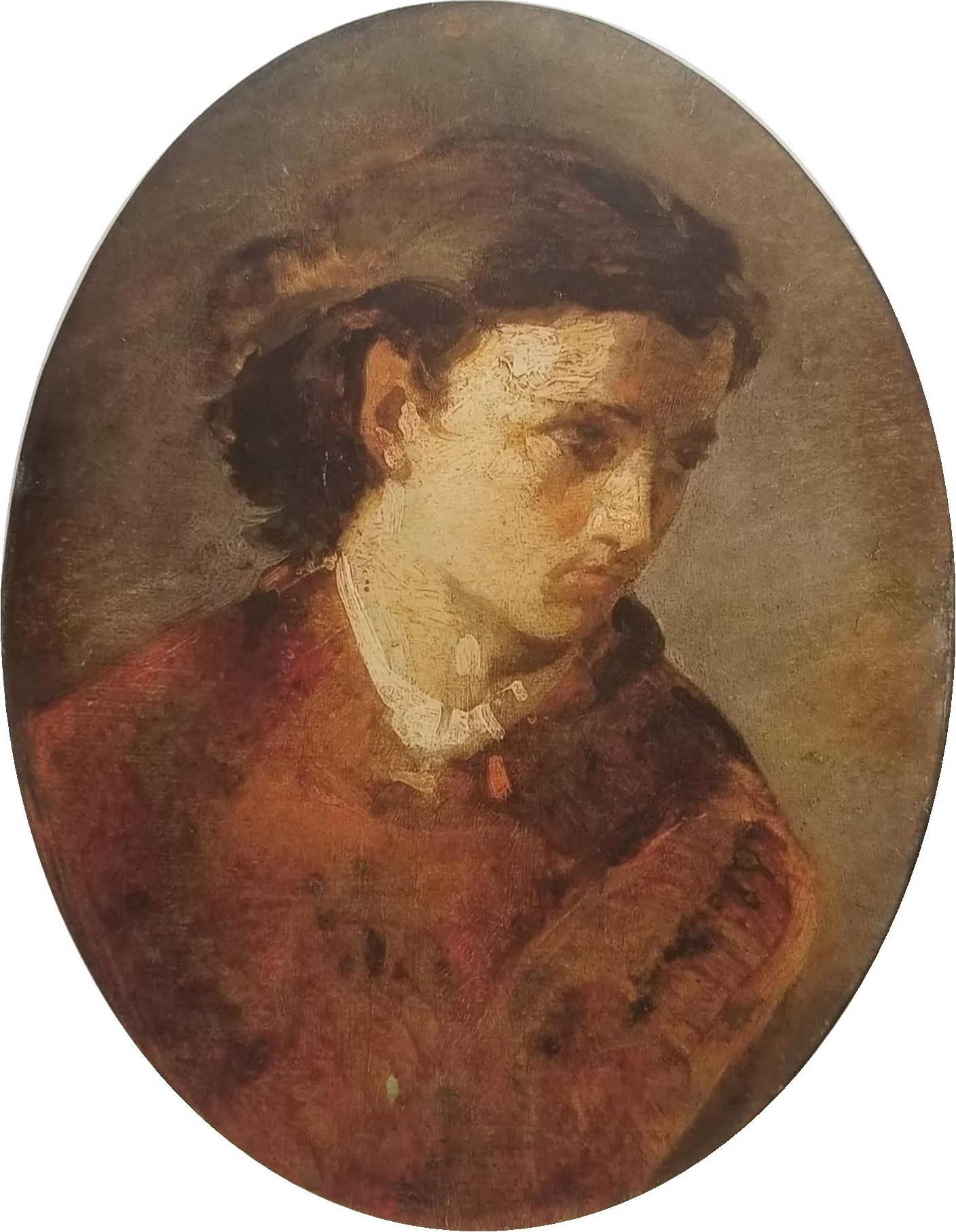
One of the only two known portraits of Anita Garibaldi, painted in Rome in 1849 by Gerolamo Induno.

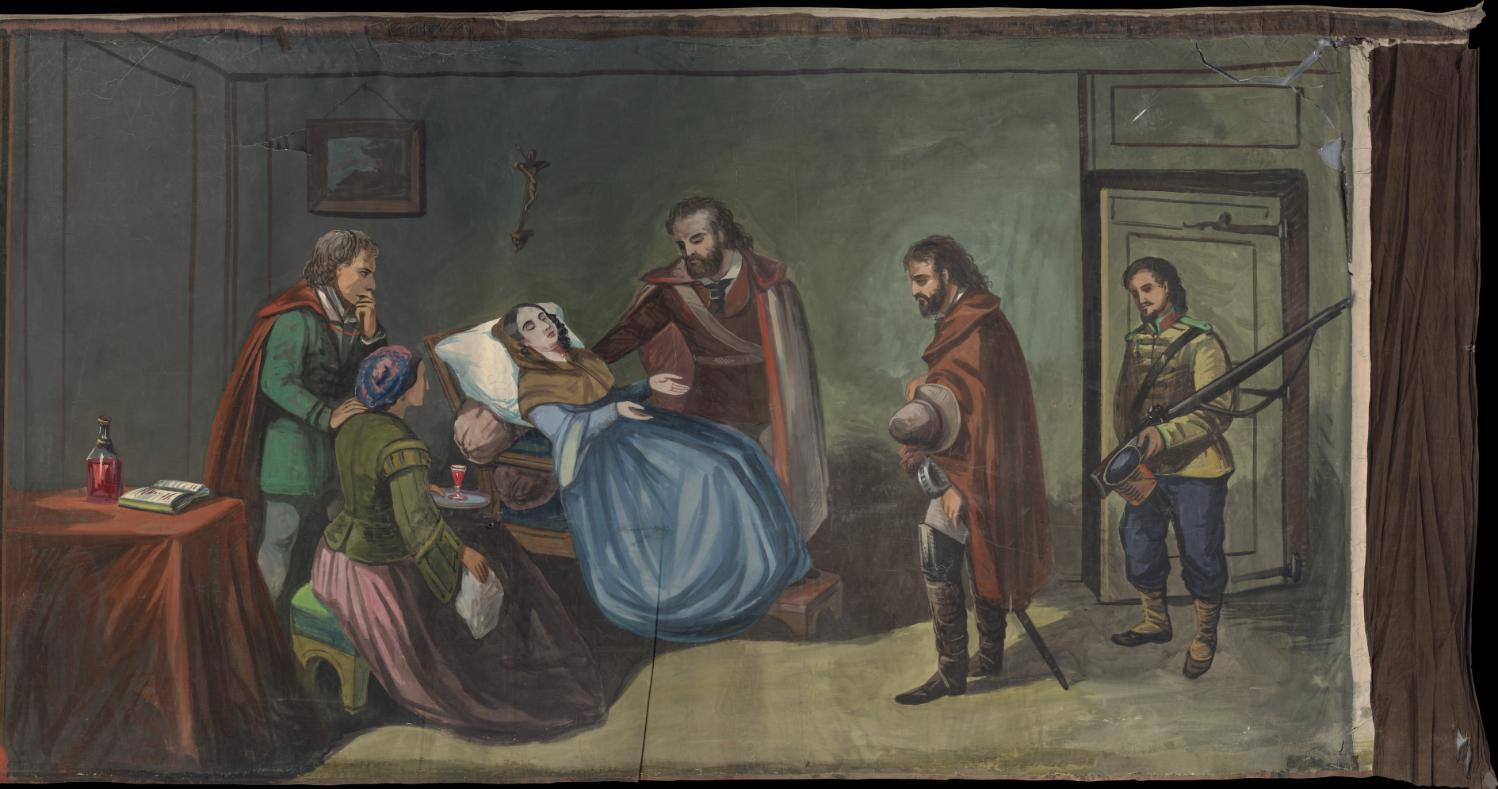
Anita dies in a farmhouse not far from Ravenna surrounded by Garibaldi, some of his comrades, and those who grant her asylum as the Austrians seek them out.

Anita accompanied Garibaldi and his red-shirted legionnaires back to Italy to join in the revolutions of 1848, where he fought against the forces of the Austrian Empire. In February 1849, Garibaldi joined in the defense of the newly proclaimed Roman Republic against Neapolitan and French intervention aimed at the restoration of the Papal States. Anita joined her husband in the defense of Rome, which fell to a French siege on June 30. She then fled from French and Austrian troops with the Garibaldian Legion. Pregnant and sick from malaria, she died on 4 August 1849, at 7:45 pm in the arms of her husband at Guiccioli Farm in Mandriole, near Ravenna, Italy, during the tragic retreat. Her body had to be hurriedly buried and was later dug up by a dog.

Anita remained a presence in Garibaldi's heart for the rest of his life. It was perhaps with her memory in mind that, while traveling in Peru in the early 1850s, he sought out the exiled and destitute Manuela Sáenz, the fabled companion of Simón Bolívar. Years later, in 1860, when Garibaldi rode out to Teano to hail Victor Emanuel II as king of a united Italy, he wore Anita's striped scarf over his gray South American poncho.

== Legacy ==
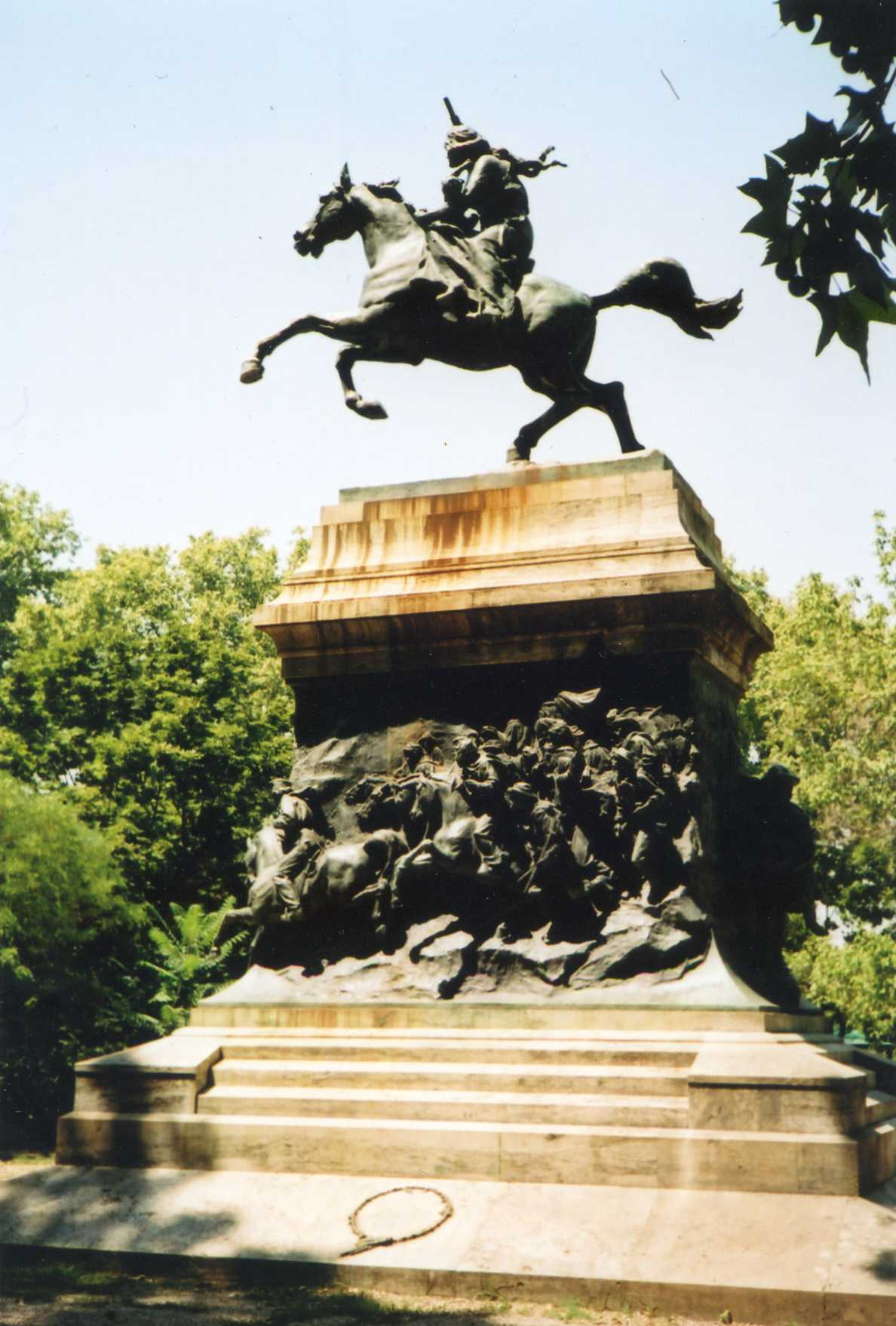
The statue of Anita Garibaldi on horseback, Janiculum Hill, Rome

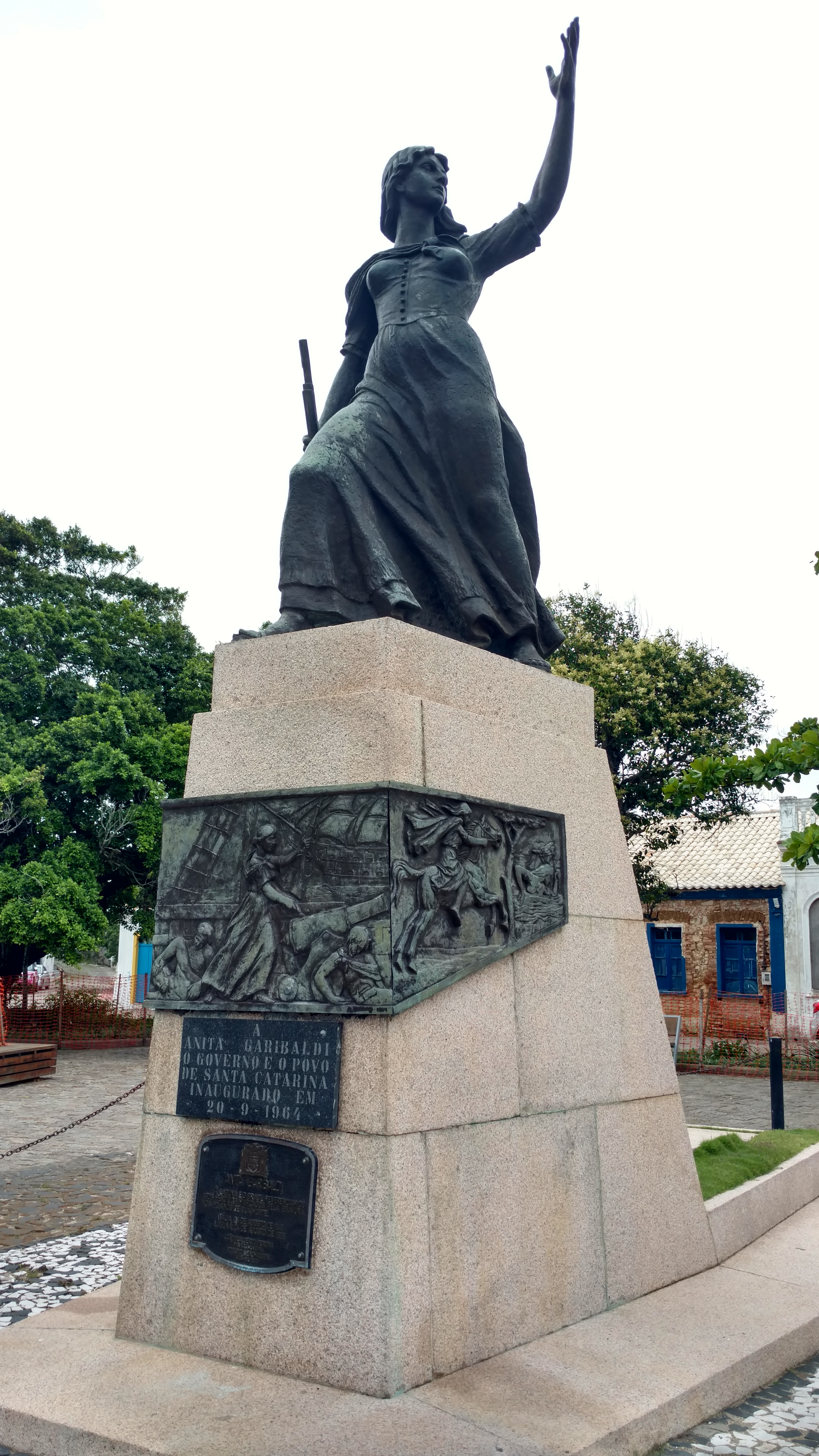
A statue of Anita Garibaldi in Laguna, Brazil.

Anita Garibaldi is a symbol of Brazilian republicanism and was recognized as a national heroine after the fall of the Brazilian Empire. There are city squares bearing her name in Brazil and a museum dedicated to her memory in Laguna.

Her legacy was also used by Mussolini. In 1932 the Vatican unofficially requested removal of the statue of her husband from the top of the Gianicolo. Mussolini replied that he would not only not remove the statue of Giuseppe but that he would also erect a new statue of Anita on the same hill. The erection of her statue on the Gianicolo in Rome was celebrated in a Three Day Commemoration. On the first day was the transfer of the remains of Anita from Genoa to Rome. On the second day was the interment of her remains in the base of a monument built in her memory on the Janiculum near the equestrian statue of her husband. On the third day was the official inauguration of the monument by Mussolini. The statue depicts Anita Garibaldi, mounted on a rearing horse, holding her baby son close in her left arm while brandishing a pistol in her right hand, as she leads her husband's army to victory.

Anita Garibaldi is the subject of the 1952 historical film Red Shirts in which she is played by Anna Magnani. She was also portrayed by Giovanna Antonelli in the 2003 Brazilian TV miniseries A Casa das Sete Mulheres and by Valeria Solarino in the 2012 Italian TV miniseries Anita Garibaldi. Ana Paula Arósio portrayed Anita Garibaldi in the 2013 historical drama film Anita e Garibaldi.

== Family tree ==
Giuseppe Garibaldi	Ana Maria de Jesus Ribeiro da Silva
Domenico Menotti Garibaldi	Rosa "Rosita" Garibaldi	Teresa "Teresita" Garibaldi	Ricciotti Garibaldi	Harriet Constance Hopcraft
Peppino Garibaldi	Costante Garibaldi	Anita Italia Garibaldi	Ezio Garibaldi	Bruno Garibaldi	Ricciotti Garibaldi Jr.	Menotti Garibaldi Jr.	Sante Garibaldi
