= Peppino Garibaldi =

Patriot, freedom fighter and a prominent member of the Garibaldi family

Brigadier General Giuseppe Garibaldi II
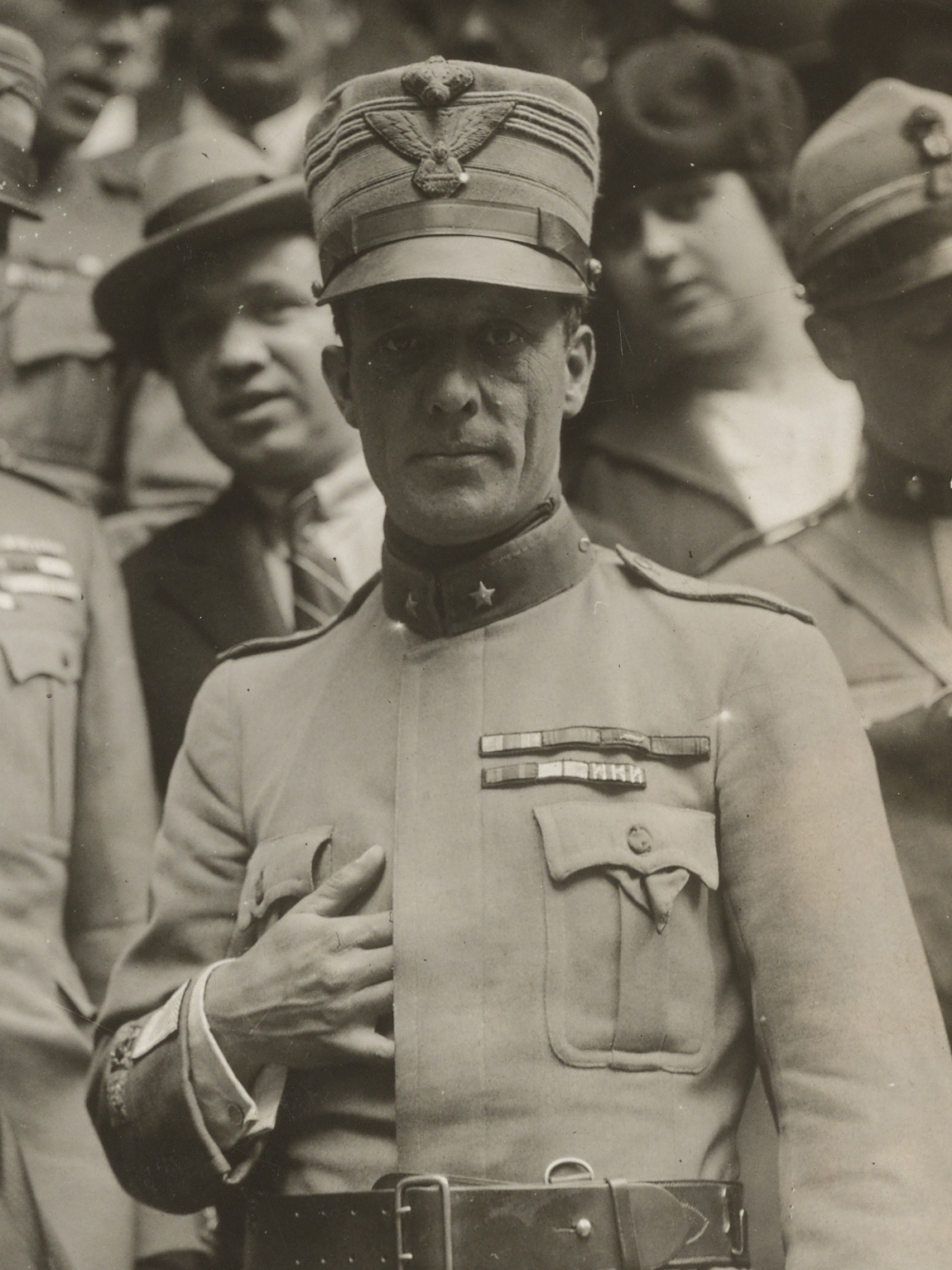
- Garibaldi in 1918
- Born: 29 July 1879; Melbourne, Colony of Victoria (now Australia)
- Died: 19 May 1950 (aged 70); Rome, Italian Republic
- Spouse: Madalyn Nichols Taylor
- Relatives: Giuseppe Garibaldi (grandfather); Anita Garibaldi (grandmother); Ricciotti Garibaldi (Father); Menotti Garibaldi (uncle)
- Military career
- Allegiance: Kingdom of Greece; United Kingdom; France (Kingdom of Sardinia) Kingdom of Italy; Maderistas
- Branch: Hellenic Army; British Army; French Army; Italian Army
- Rank: Brigadier General
- Nickname: Peppino Garibaldi
- Unit: French Foreign Legion
- Commands: Commander of Garibaldi Legion
- Conflicts: Greco-Turkish War (1897); Battle of Domokos; Second Boer War; Mexican Revolution; Battle of Ciudad Juárez; Balkan Wars; First Balkan War; Battle of Driskos; World War I; Western Front; Italian Front

Brigadier-General Giuseppe Garibaldi II (29 July 1879 – 19 May 1950), better known as Peppino Garibaldi, was an Italian soldier, patriot and revolutionary. He was the grandson of Giuseppe Garibaldi.

== Biography ==
Garibaldi was born in Melbourne, Australia, the son of Ricciotti Garibaldi and Harriet Constance Hopcraft.

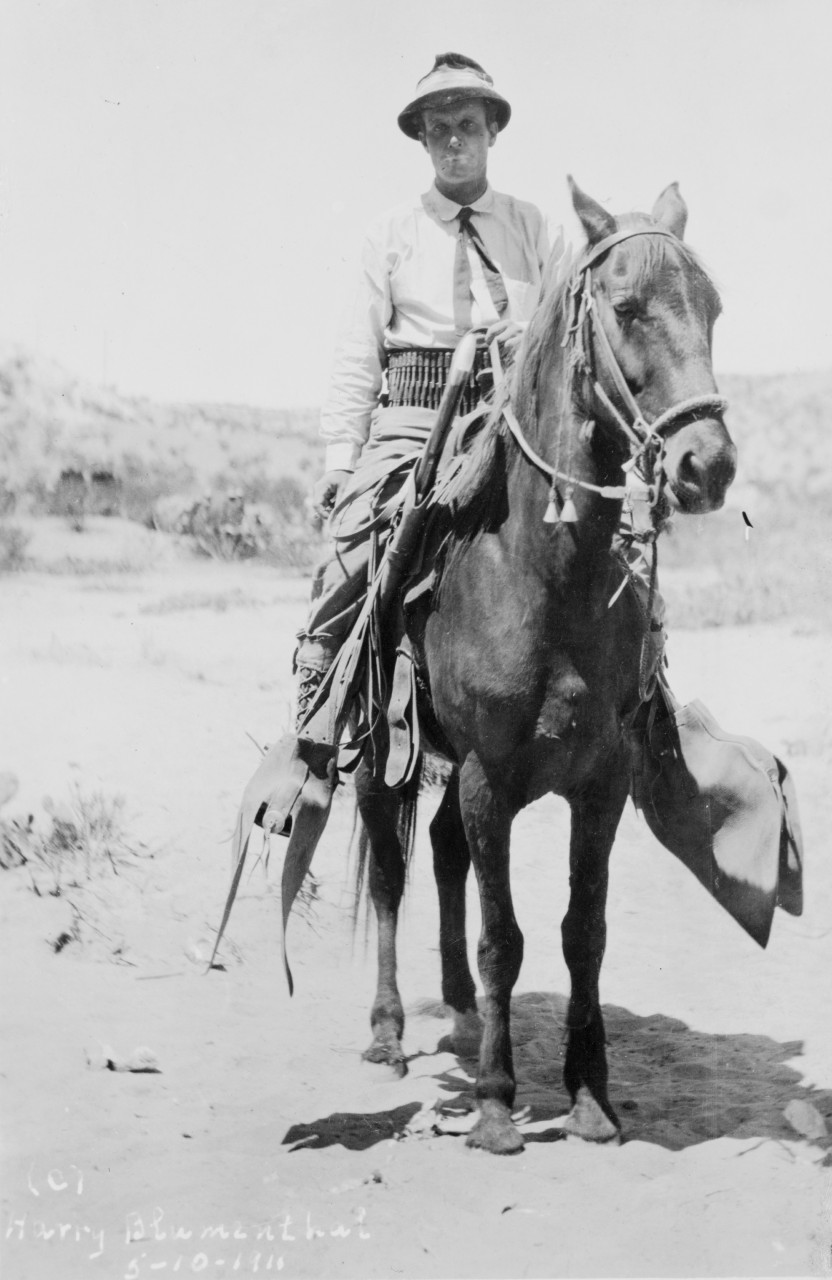
Peppino Garibaldi in Mexico, 1911

Together with his father, he took part in the Greco-Turkish War of 1897 alongside the Greeks and afterwards fought with the liberals against Cipriano Castro in Venezuela, and in other conflicts in South America. He volunteered and served with great distinction in the British Army during the Second Boer War, carrying with him a sword given to his grandfather by the working men of Tyneside, England, in 1854.

He served as a lieutenant colonel (teniente coronel) in the army of Francisco I. Madero during the initial victories of the 1910 Mexican Revolution. Plaza Garibaldi in Mexico City was named in honor of his actions in the battle of Nuevo Casas Grandes. Pancho Villa sacked Lt Col Garibaldi because of a bitter controversy over the credit for the victory at the First Battle of Ciudad Juárez in 1911, but the name of the plaza (formerly Pila de la Habana) stuck nonetheless, despite the way he left the Army of the Revolution.

Garibaldi again served with the Greek Army during the First Balkan War in 1912, fighting at the Battle of Drisko alongside his father.

At the outbreak of World War I, Garibaldi joined the French army at the head of the 4e régiment de marche du 1er étranger and later fought on the Italian front for Italy. In November 1915 his unit was the one that planted the Italian flag on the summit of Col di Lana. For this he received a promotion to colonel. He was promoted to brigadier-general in June 1918, retiring from the military one year later.

Garibaldi opposed the National Fascist Party régime of Benito Mussolini which came to power in 1922 (while his younger brother Ezio favored it). He eventually left Italy for the United States, where he married Madalyn Nichols Taylor. In 1940 he returned to Italy, where in 1943 the German authorities arrested and imprisoned him in the Regina Coeli prison in Rome. After the war he retired to private life.

He died in Rome in 1950, aged 70.

== Plaza Garibaldi in Mexico City ==
In 1921, during the celebrations of the first centenary of the end of the Mexican War of Independence, the old tianguis El Baratillo of Mexico City changed its name to Plaza Garibaldi in honor of Peppino Garibaldi. Also known as Plaza Santa Cecilia, it is famous for the groups of mariachis, norteño groups, romantic trios and Veracruz music groups that meet there, dressed in their typical attire and equipped with their musical instruments to carry out a serenade.

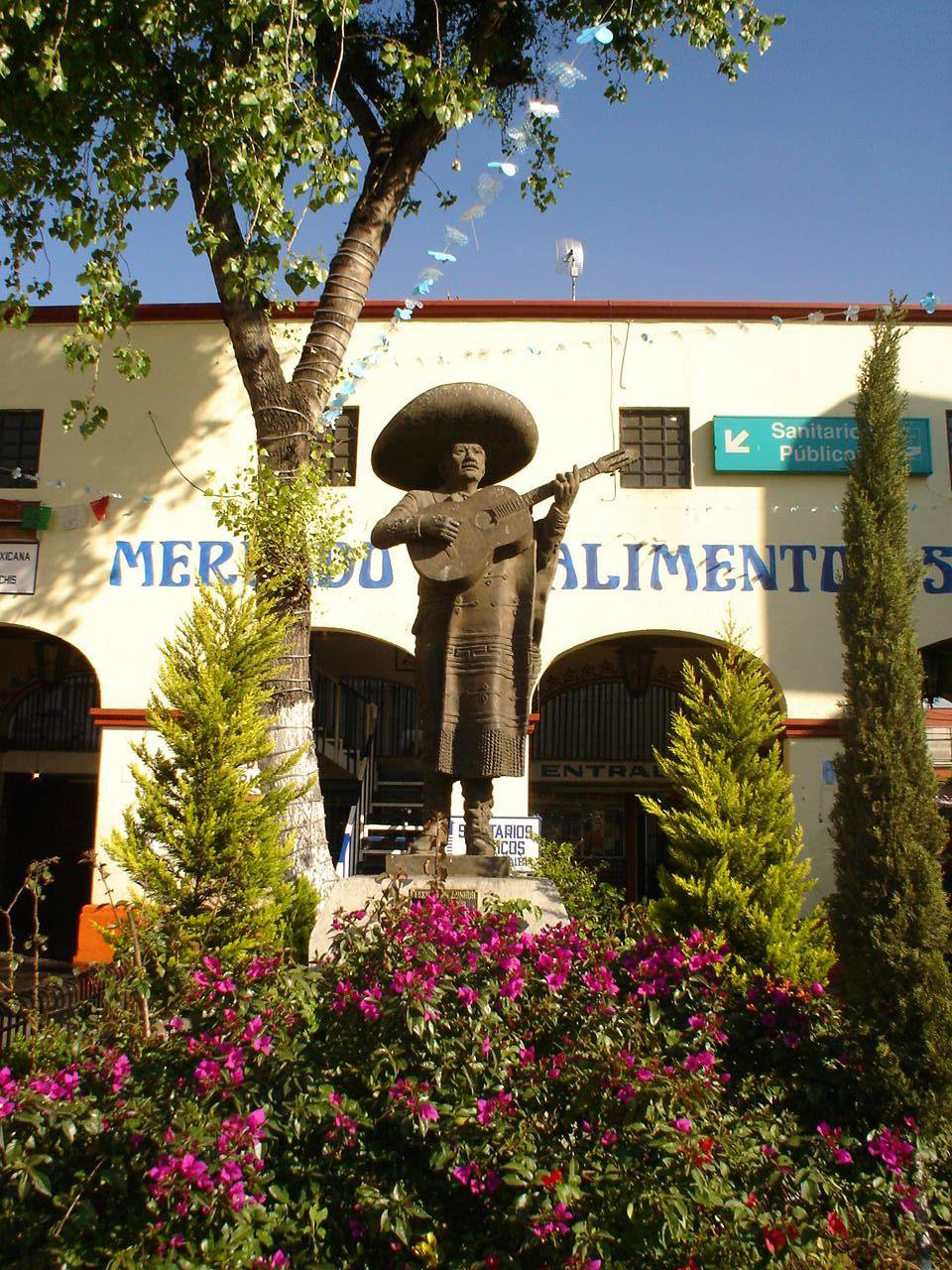
Monument to mariachi in Plaza Garibaldi in Mexico City

== Family tree ==
Giuseppe Garibaldi	Ana Maria de Jesus Ribeiro da Silva
Domenico Menotti Garibaldi	Rosa "Rosita" Garibaldi	Teresa "Teresita" Garibaldi	Ricciotti Garibaldi	Harriet Constance Hopcraft
Peppino Garibaldi	Costante Garibaldi	Anita Italia Garibaldi	Ezio Garibaldi	Bruno Garibaldi	Ricciotti Garibaldi Jr.	Menotti Garibaldi Jr.	Sante Garibaldi

== Bibliography ==
Notes

References

- Bell, David (2001). Ships, Strikes and Keelmen. TUPS. ISBN 9781901237269.
- Heyriès, Hubert (2005). Les Garibaldiens de 14: splendeurs et misères des chemises rouges en France de la grande guerre à la seconde guerre mondiale (in French). SERRE EDITEUR. ISBN 9782864104384. - Total pages: 672
- The Ogden Standard (November 12, 1915). "Peppino Garibaldi promoted". The Ogden standard. ISSN 2163-4793. OCLC 12982876. Archived from the original on November 15, 2015.
