= Ricciotti Garibaldi =

Italian soldier, the fourth son of Giuseppe Garibaldi and Anita Garibaldi

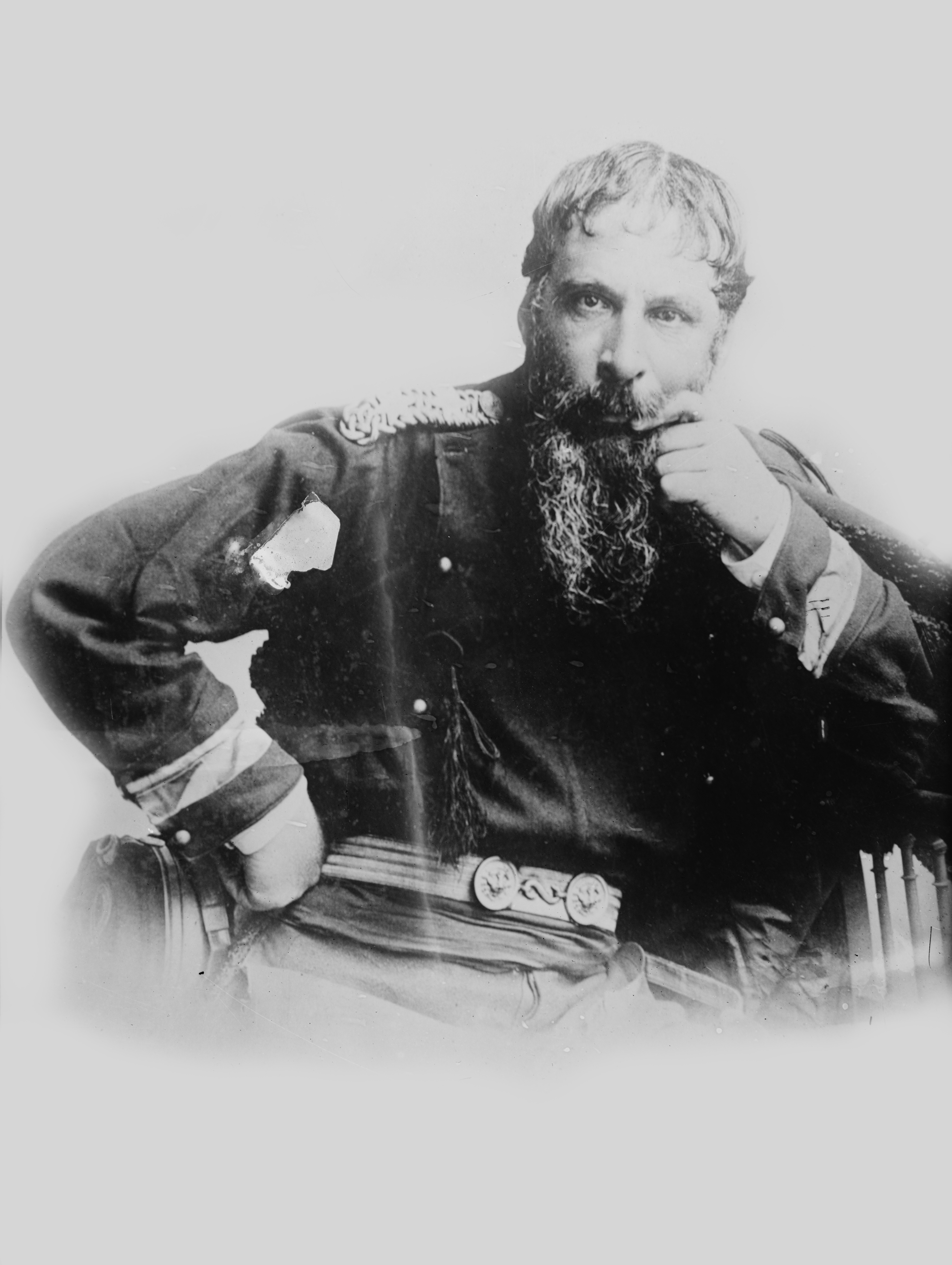
- Ricciotti Garibaldi
- Born: 24 February 1847; Montevideo, Uruguay
- Died: 17 July 1924 (aged 77); Riofreddo, Italy
- Spouse: Harriet Constance Hopcraft
- Relatives: Son of the father of Italy, Giuseppe Garibaldi, and Anita Garibaldi; Father of Giuseppe Garibaldi II
- Military career
- Allegiance: Kingdom of Italy; Kingdom of Greece
- Rank: Brigadier-general
- Commands: Commander of Garibaldi Legion
- Conflicts: Battle of Bezzecca (1866); Battle of Mentana (1867); Great Cretan Revolution (1866–1869); 1870, during his father's expedition in support to France during the Franco-Prussian War; Greco-Turkish War (1897); First Balkan War

Ricciotti Garibaldi (24 February 1847 – 17 July 1924) was an Italian soldier, the fourth son of Giuseppe Garibaldi and Anita Garibaldi.

== Biography ==
Born in Montevideo, he was named in honour of Nicola Ricciotti who had been executed during the failed expedition of the Bandiera Brothers against the Kingdom of Naples. He spent much of his youth in Nice, Caprera and England.

In 1866, alongside his father, he took part in the Battle of Bezzecca (1866) and the Battle of Mentana (1867); he also went to Crete to organize the Greek revolutionaries in the Great Cretan Revolution. In 1870, during his father's expedition in support to France during the Franco-Prussian War, he fought for the Army of the Vosges, during which he occupied Châtillon and, at Pouilly, during the Battle of Dijon, captured the sole Prussian flag lost during the war.

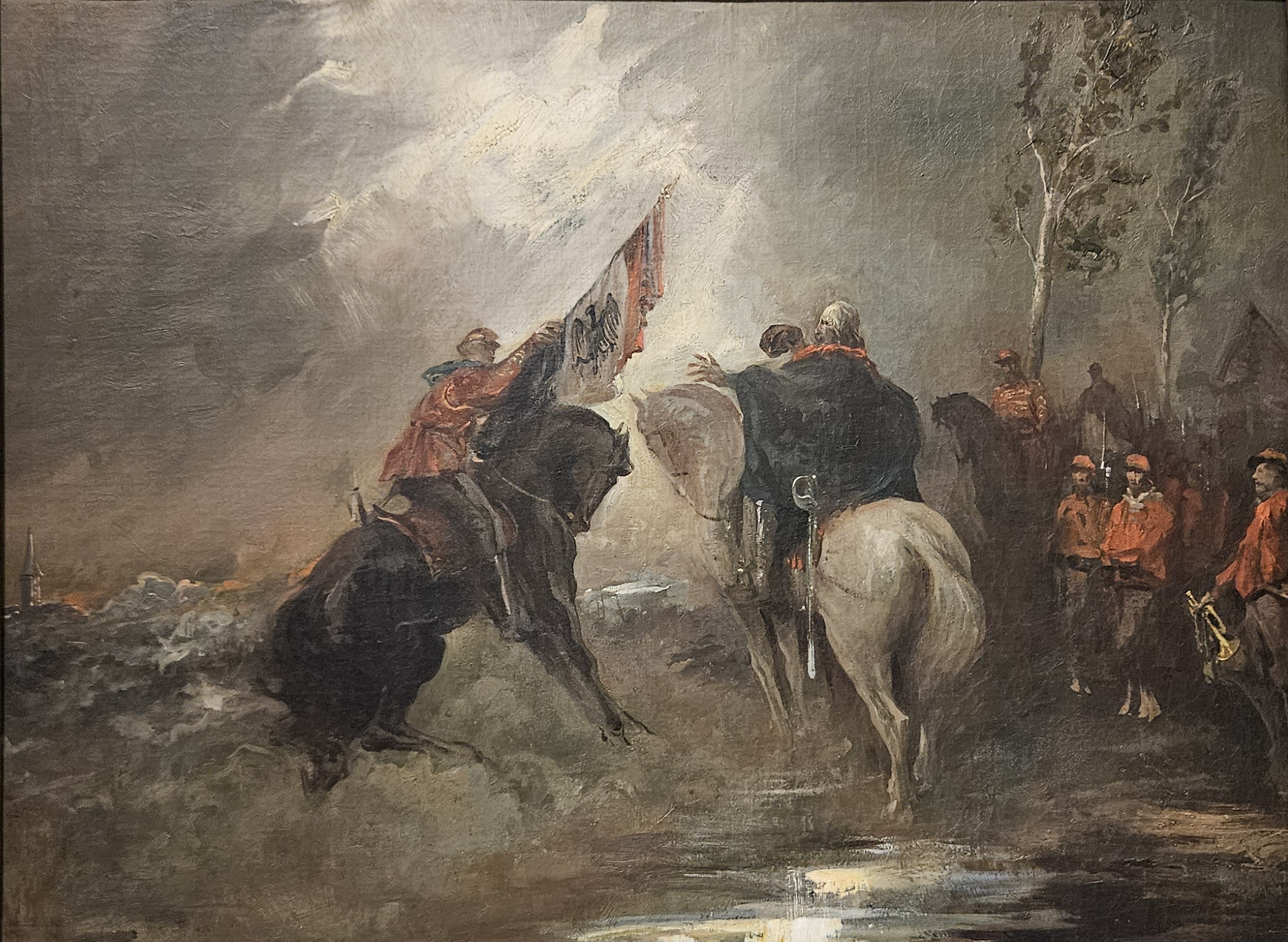
Ricciotti Garibaldi presents to his father the Prussian flag of the 61st Pomeranian Regiment (1871)

After a failed attempt to create market enterprises in America and Australia, he was a deputy in the Italian Parliament from 1887 to 1890. In the Turkish-Greek War in 1897, he fought with the Greek Army against the Ottomans with other Garibaldines. It was reported that in 1900 during the Boer War, he placed his sword at the disposal of the British Government. His offer was declined.

in 1912, Garibaldi organised a force of redshirts to fight alongside Greek forces in the First Balkan War, commanding troops at the Battle of Drisko.

His revolutionary commitment continued when Giuseppe Garibaldi definitively broke with Mazzini, taking a favorable position towards the First International of Workers; in November 1871 Ricciotti was in London, where he visited Karl Marx and also met Friedrich Engels at his home. His popularity among workers' and anarchist circles increased and, after the death of Giuseppe Mazzini, together with some Mazzinians and some Garibaldians, he founded, in August 1872, gathering 300 people at the Argentina theater, the association of the Franchi cafoni or "association of the Free Cafoni", a name with peasant references, and probably of Bakunian inspiration, with which he would have liked to bring together the Italian democrats to organize "pure democracy" The name of the movement's press organ, "Spartacus", is indicative of the revolutionary aims of the association, which had universal suffrage among its objectives The association soon took on the characteristics of an association of socialist ideals, ending up in a short time being dissolved by the Roman police headquarters.

In 1874 he married the Englishwoman Constance Hopcraft, moving seven years to Australia, where his first son, Peppino, was born in 1879. After running in vain in 1883, in 1887 he was elected deputy to the Chamber of Deputies in the XVI legislature, in the college of Rome I, but resigned in 1890.

A convinced interventionist, he did not participate directly in the First World War, but he animated the home front. He pushed his son Peppino to gather a legion of Italian volunteers who were employed in the Argonne where two of his other sons, Bruno and Constant, lost their lives.

Subsequently, in 1919, he expressed his support for D'Annunzio's Impresa di Fiume, offering to support with his men the extension to Montenegro of the expansionist vocations of the Rijeka legionaries. In 1922, he also sought to create a volunteer regiment to fight for Greece during the Greco-Turkish War, just like he had done a few decades prior, but ultimately failed to do so due to strict laws limiting foreign volunteers by the Greek government.

Garibaldi adhered to fascism, and personally received Benito Mussolini, whom he met during the irredentist period, on the occasion of his visit to Caprera on 10 June 1923. However, his support for Mussolini was far from decisive. During the August–September 1923 Corfu incident, Garibaldi opposed Mussolini and supported Greece.

Ricciotti Garibaldi died in Riofreddo in 17 July 1924.

== Personal life ==
Of his six sons, five including Peppino (Giuseppe II.,1879–1950) and Ezio Garibaldi were soldiers in World War I. Two of them died in the Argonne offensives: Bruno (1889-1914) and Costante (1892-1915). He also had a daughter, Anita, who died in 1962.

== Family tree ==
Giuseppe Garibaldi	Ana Maria de Jesus Ribeiro da Silva
Domenico Menotti Garibaldi	Rosa "Rosita" Garibaldi	Teresa "Teresita" Garibaldi	Ricciotti Garibaldi	Harriet Constance Hopcraft
Peppino Garibaldi	Costante Garibaldi	Anita Italia Garibaldi	Ezio Garibaldi	Bruno Garibaldi	Ricciotti Garibaldi Jr.	Menotti Garibaldi Jr.	Sante Garibaldi
