= Santo Tagliafico =

Italian painter (1756–1829)

Santo Tagliafico, also known as Santino Fortunato Tagliafichi (1756–1829), was an Italian painter, mainly active in Genoa. He trained under Carlo Giuseppe Ratti. He was a member of a prolific family of artists, including his father, Nicolò Gaetano (1698–1776), who was an engineer and scenic designer; and Santo's brothers starting with Andrea (architect); Giuseppe (priest and not artist); Giovanni (architect); Giambattista (engineer and scenic designer); and Domenico (jeweller). Further family members were (Emanuele) Andrea (1729–1812), and Giovanni Andrea. One of Santo's pupils was Gaetano Gallino.
