= Ciro Menotti =

Italian patriot

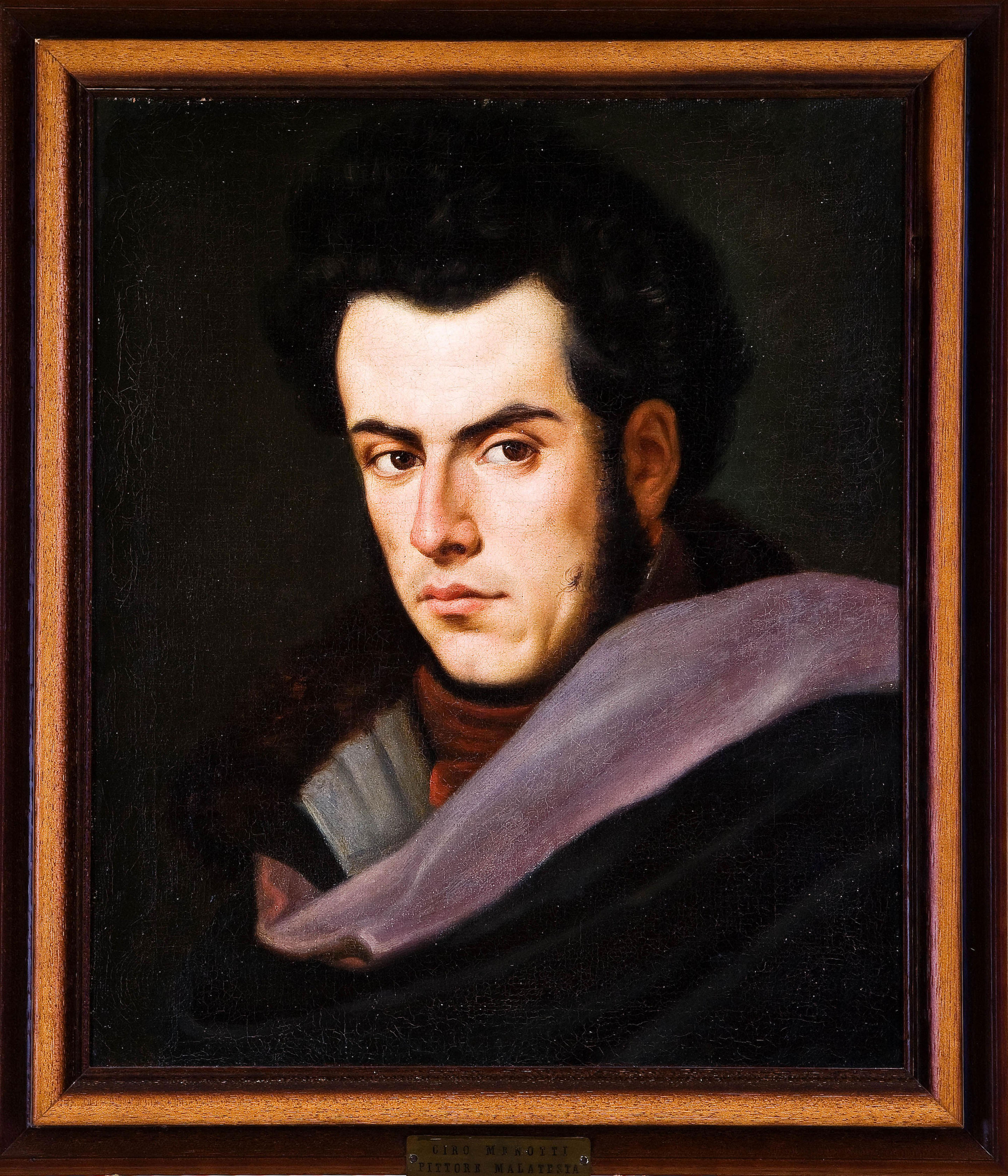
Portrait by Adeodato Malatesta

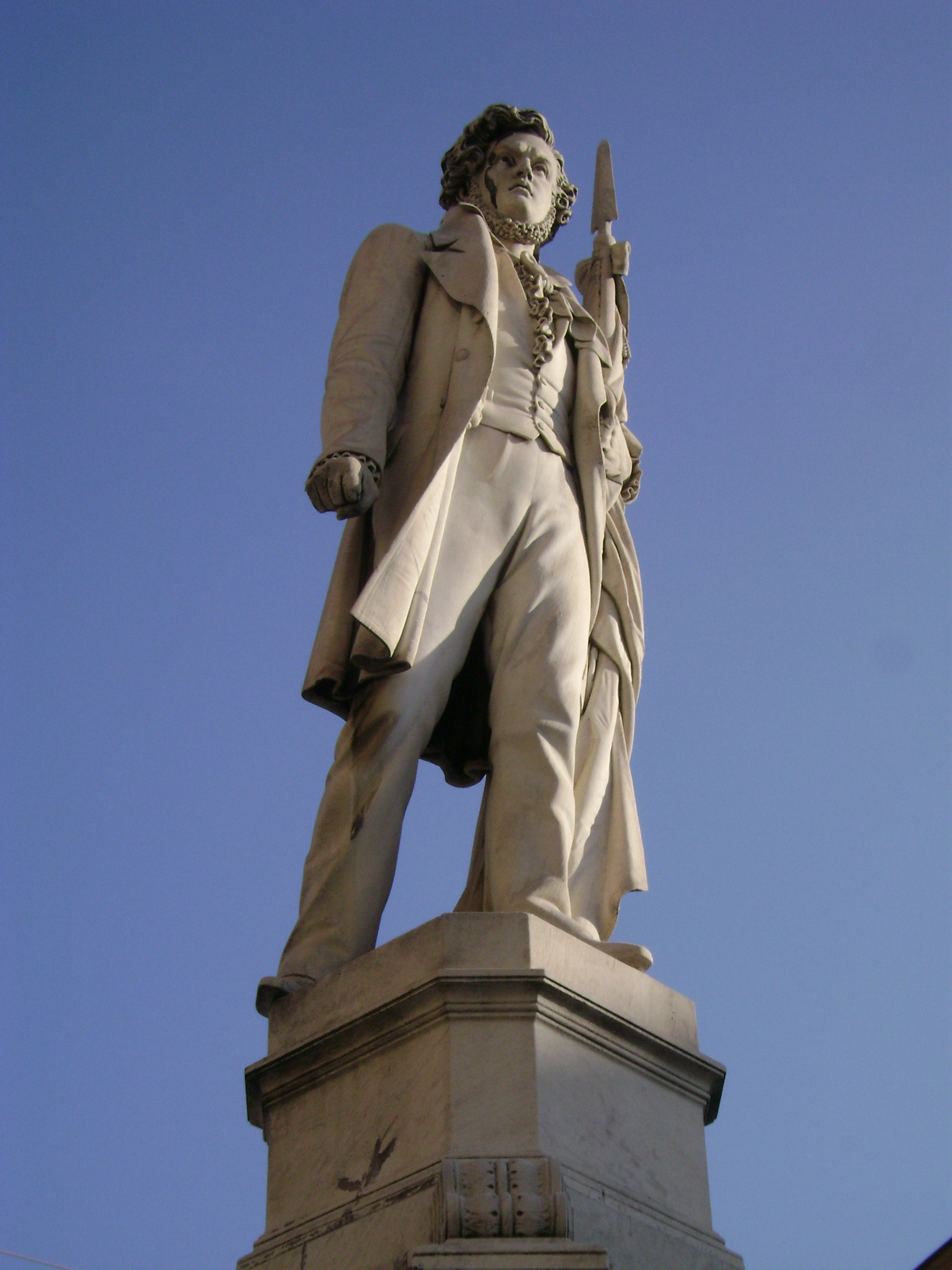
Monument to Menotti in Piazza Roma, Modena

Ciro Menotti (22 January 1798 – 23 May 1831) was an Italian nationalist and liberal revolutionary who is known for his participation in the Revolution of 1830 in Italy, for which he was executed in 1831.

== Biography ==
Menotti was born in Migliarina, near Carpi, then part of the Duchy of Modena and Reggio. A member of the Carboneria since 1817, he was a fervent democratic and patriot. From 1820 he held contacts with French intellectuals, with the goal to free Modena from the Austrian control.

Initially, Duke Francis IV declared favorably for Menotti's claim, probably encouraged at the possibility of becoming its king in a future unified Northern Italy. Menotti organized a revolt in Modena for 3 February 1831 but, in a brusque volte-face, Francis denied him his support, and even, from his voluntary exile in Mantua, called the help of Austria and its allies. Menotti was arrested and, after a summary process, condemned to death by hanging. The sentence was executed in the Citadel of Modena.

Afterwards Menotti came to be seen as a martyr of the Italian Risorgimento. In 1880 the former Garibaldine officer Taddeo Grandi wrote a biography of him. A monument in Modena was built to Menotti in 1879, facing the former Grand Duke's palace.

Giuseppe Garibaldi named his first child Menotti after him.

== Bibliography ==
- A. Solmi, Ciro Menotti e l'idea unitaria nell'insurrezione del 1831: con un'appendice di documenti , Modena, Società tipografica Modenese, 1931.
- Atto Vannucci I martiri della libertà italiana dal 1794 al 1848 - volume terzo e ultimo pag. 8 LIII Ciro Menotti tipografia Bertolotti & C. 1880 sesta edizione Milano
- Roberto Vaccari, La capitale dei sogni. Il romanzo di Ciro Menotti , Modena, Colombini, 2016, ISBN 978-88-6509-154-8
- "Menotti, Ciro". Dizionario Biografico degli Italiani (in Italian). Vol. 73: Meda–Messadaglia. Rome: Istituto dell'Enciclopedia Italiana. 2009. ISBN 978-88-12-00032-6.
