= Caprera =

Island of Italy near Sardinia

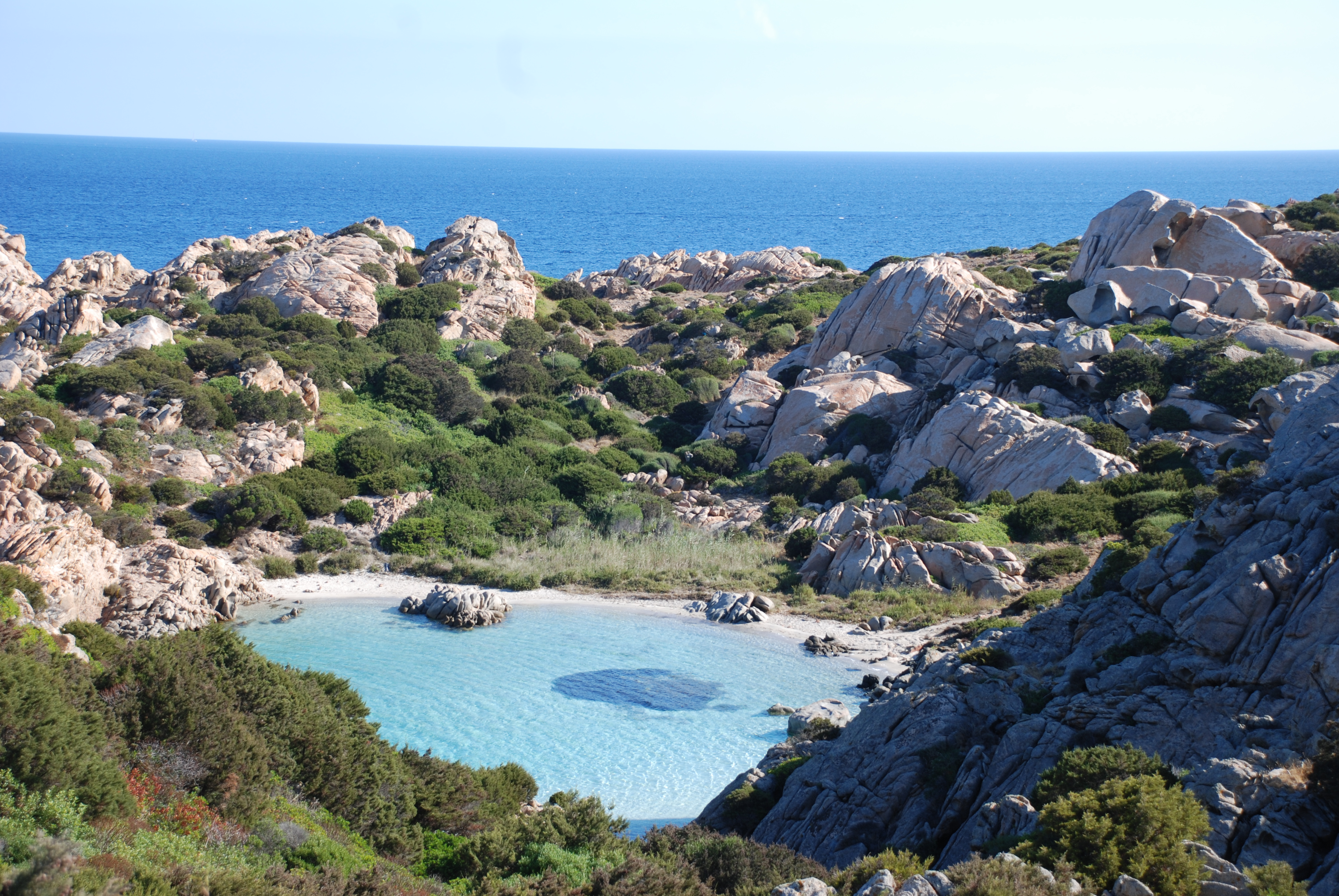
- Cala Napoletana on the northwest shore of Caprera

- Location within Sardinia

Geography
- Location: Strait of Bonifacio
- Coordinates: 41°12′26″N 9°27′40″E
- Archipelago: Maddalena archipelago
- Area: 15.7 km^{2} (6.1 sq mi)
- Highest elevation: 212 m (696 ft)
- Highest point: Monte Tejalone

Administration
- Italy
- Region: Sardinia
- Province: Olbia-Tempio

Caprera is an island in the Maddalena archipelago off the coast of Sardinia, Italy. In the area of La Maddalena island in the Strait of Bonifacio, it is a tourist destination and the place to which Giuseppe Garibaldi retired from 1854 until his death in 1882. Scarcely populated, the majority of the inhabitants live in Borgo di Stagnali. The island of Caprera is entirely included in the La Maddalena Archipelago National Park: a marine and land protected area of national and community interest. In particular, the marine zone in front of the area of Punta Rossa, a southern extension of the island, is an area with maximum environmental protection, with Cala Andreani and Spiaggia del Relitto. The eastern ridge of the island is a land zone of full protection, while the marine area in front of Punta Coticcio, including Cala Coticcio, is protected by the managing authority of the National Park.

== Features ==
The island was probably given its name because of the numerous wild goats living on it (capra means "goat" in Italian). It is the second largest island in the archipelago and has an area of 15.7 km^{2} (6.1 sq mi) and 45 km (28 mi) of coastline. Monte Tejalone is the highest point (212 m). On the south-western side is a sailing centre and the many coves and anchorages along the coastline make the landing easy. This island has been declared a natural reserve for the resident seabirds, the royal seagull, cormorant and peregrine falcon. Caprera is linked to La Maddalena island by a 600-metre (2,000 ft) causeway.

== Giuseppe Garibaldi ==
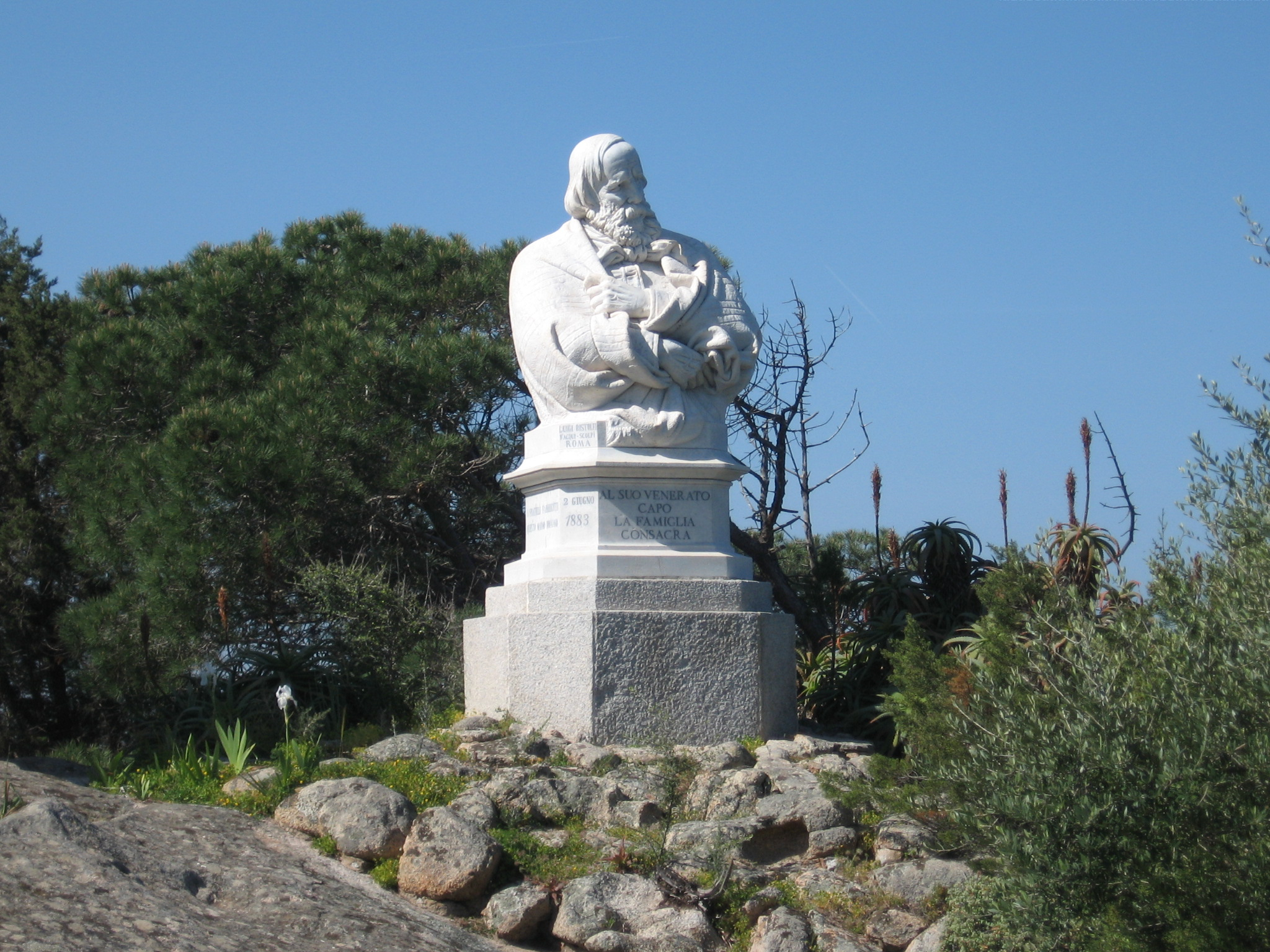
Monument to Giuseppe Garibaldi in Caprera.

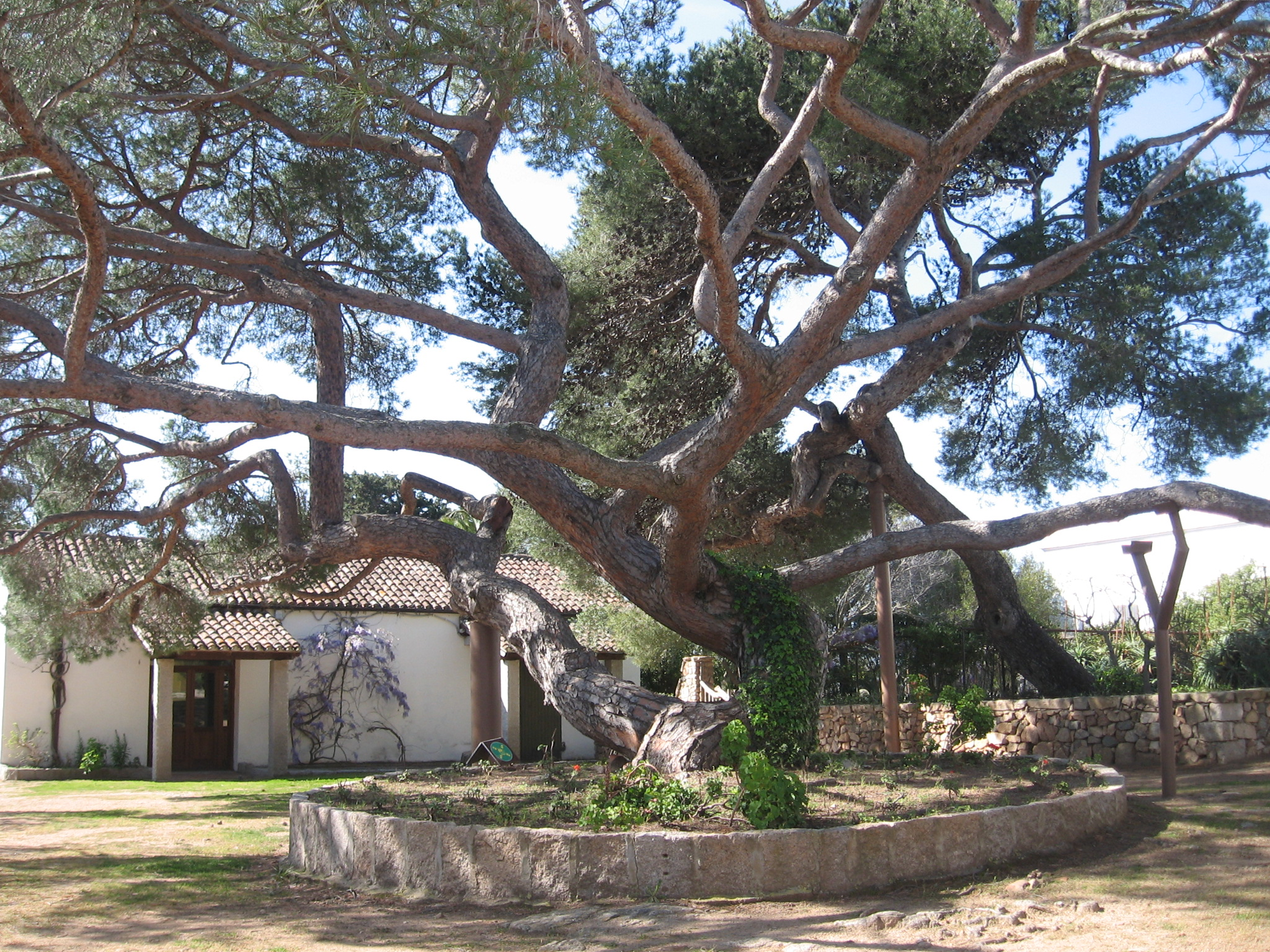
Giuseppe Garibaldi, La Casa Bianca

The island is associated with Giuseppe Garibaldi, an Italian patriot and fighter who lived in the 19th century and was one of the fathers of Italian unification. He bought about half of the island in 1855 and died there in 1882. His house, known as the Compendio Garibaldino, is now a museum and a memorial chapel, and the island is a national monument.

== History ==
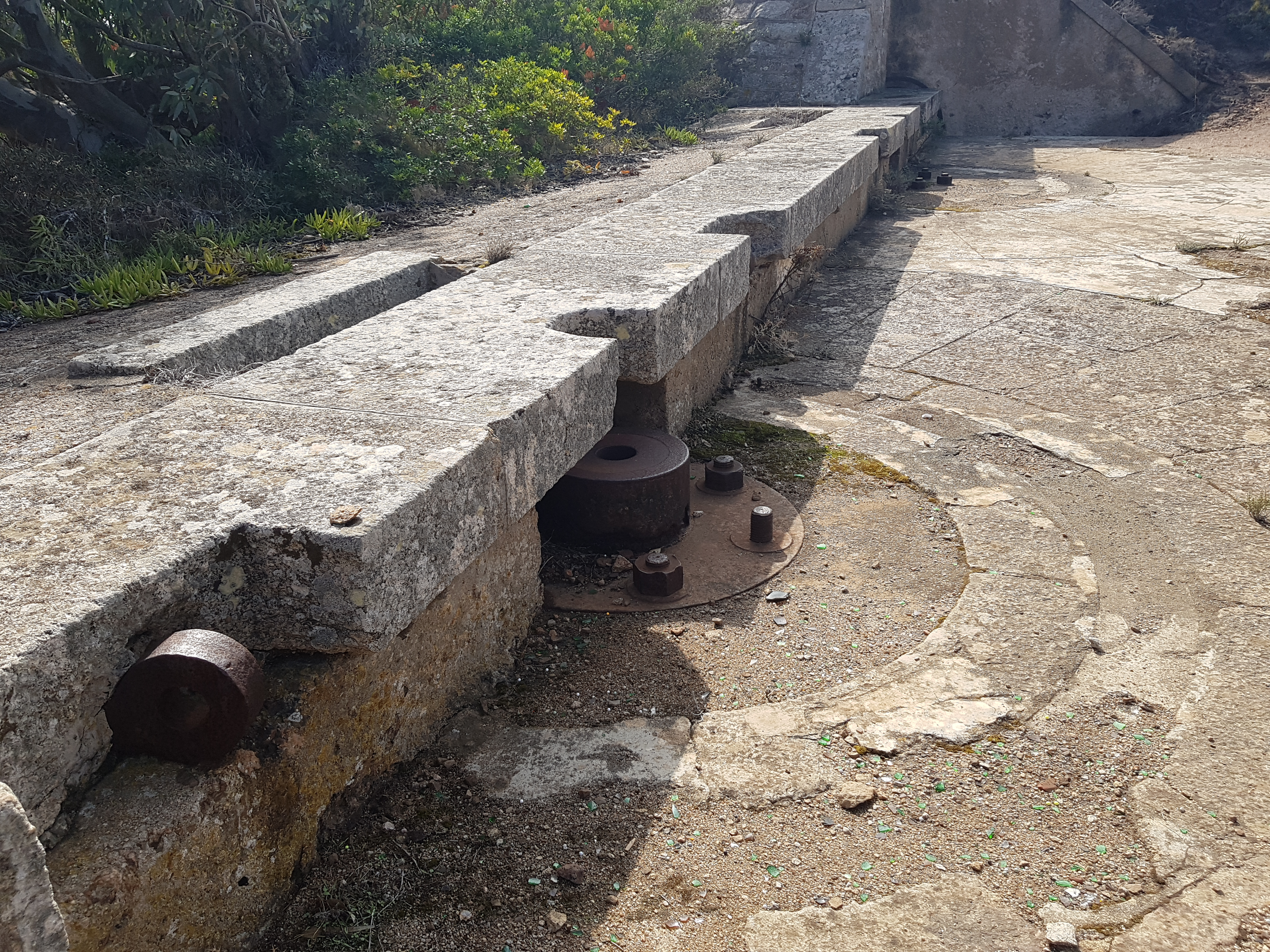
Fortification of Poggio Rasu (Caprera, Sardinia). The pedestal was probably used for Hotchkiss 57 mm gun (QF 6-pounder Hotchkiss) or 57/43 Mod. 1887 QF 6-pounder Nordenfelt (both used by the Italian army)

After the Roman occupation, Caprera remained deserted for centuries.

In Dante’s Inferno (Canto XXXIII, lines 79-84), written in the early years of 1300, the soul of Count Ugolino invokes a curse to punish the evil residents of Pisa by moving the islands of Caprera and Gorgona to block the mouth of the Arno river and flood the city.

At the beginning of the 19th century, a group of shepherds inhabited the island. In the second half of the same century, an English family settled there, the Collins, owners of some lands on the island. Many remains of Roman cargo ships have been found here. In 1855, Garibaldi decided to settle there and planted the first trees of the blooming pinewood which covers the island today. A century after Garibaldi's death, the island was freed from military restrictions and is completely open to the public.

The island is known especially for having been Giuseppe Garibaldi’s last abode for over 20 years and the place of his death. Indeed, with the inheritance of his brother Felix, he acquired the northern half of Caprera in 1856, having initially lived in a hut.

A few years later, the famous Casa Bianca was built in accordance with Garibaldi’s will, in the South American fazenda style, nowadays a museum; some years after, funds raised by his sons and fans allowed him to buy also the other half of the island, which until then had belonged to the English spouses Richard and Emma Collins.

In the estate, Piana della Tola, Garibaldi planted a lot of trees and started living the life of a farmer, cultivating fields and breeding chickens, sheep, horses (his white mare Marsala is buried not far from the house) and a lot of donkeys, to whom he gave his enemies’ names out of amusement. The most unruly of them was called after Pope Pius IX.

Inside the Casa Bianca, Garibaldi lived with the sons that he had with Anita, the ones he had with a servant and the ones he had with his third wife, Francesca Armosino.

In Garibaldi’s room, the clock and the calendars, which are hanging on a wall, still mark the date and time of his death: 2 June 1882 at 6.21 pm. Despite his last wishes, his remains were embalmed and buried in a grave (made of rough granite) just behind the house.

His house, boats and objects, which have become relics of one of the best known and visited museums in Italy, have remained in Caprera. The Garibaldi Compendium of Caprera is open for visit, except for weekly closure on Mondays. Garibaldi’s life on the island and how he cultivated it are described in the memoir written by his daughter Clelia, entitled Mio Padre.

In 1982, Caprera was declared an Oriented Nature Reserve, until the establishment of the National Park.

== Sailing ==
Caprera's Porto Palma gulf is home to the Centro Velico Caprera school since 1967.

== See also ==
- List of islands of Italy
- Caprera Canyon
