= Garibaldi Legion (Foreign Legion) =

- 4th Marching Regiment of the 1st Foreign Regiment; 4^{e} régiment de marche du 1^{er} étranger
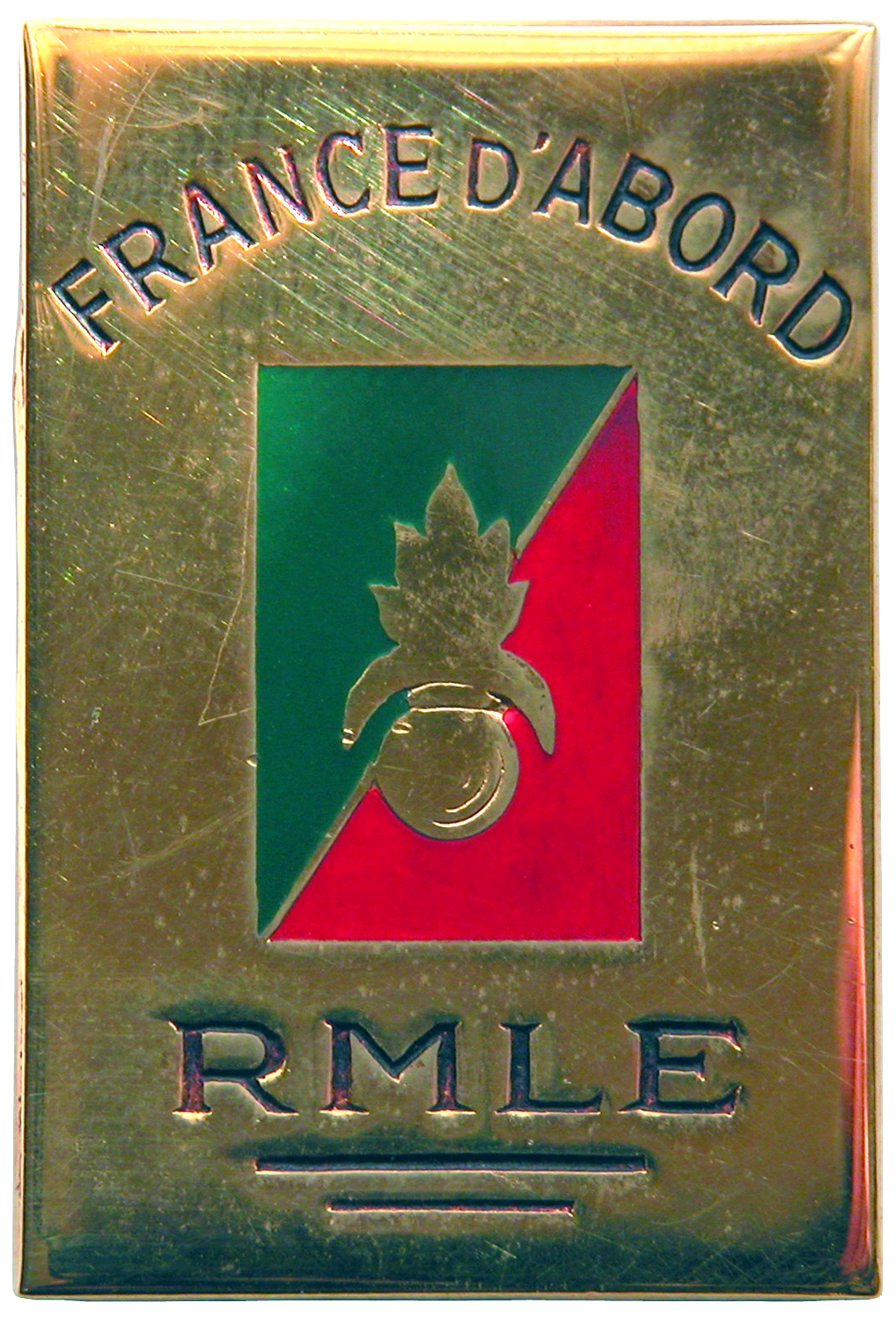
- Garibaldi Legion
- Active: November 5, 1914 - May 5, 1915
- Disbanded: 1915
- Country: France
- Branch: French Army
- Type: Light infantry
- Role: Marching Regiment
- Size: 2200
- Nicknames: Garibaldi Legion; Légion Garibaldienne
- Engagements: Battle of the Argonne

Commanders
- Notable commanders: Lieutenant-Colonel Peppino Garibaldi (Giuseppe Garibaldi II)

Insignia
- Abbreviation: 3ème R.M.1^{er}R.E

The Garibaldi Legion (French: Légion Garibaldienne) or officially the 4th Marching Regiment of the 1st Foreign Regiment (French: 4^{e} régiment de marche du 1^{er} étranger, 4^{e}R.M. 1^{er}R.E) was a unit of the Foreign Legion in the French Army which formed the Marching Regiment of the Foreign Legion composed entirely of Italian citizens, who fought in France in World War I against the Germans and existing ephemerally from the end of 1914 to 1915. After having distinguished themselves at Argonne (Bois de Balante) in December 1914, the regiment was finally dissolved on May 5, 1915, due to Italy's entry in the war and the departure of the majority of the regiment back to their country of origin.

Today the Legion in Italy is an association of veterans and people who share the ideals of the Republic Garibaldi.

== Creation and different nominations ==
- On November 5, 1914: the 4th Marching Regiment of the 1st Foreign Regiment (French: 4^{e} régiment de marche du 1^{er} étranger, 4^{e} R.M. 1^{er}R.E) was created.
- On March 5, 1915: dissolution of the regiment.

== History ==
With the outbreak of World War I in the fall of 1914, Giuseppe Garibaldi II (also known as Peppino Garibaldi) and his four brothers went to England to offer their services. The English refused, so Peppino went to Paris and agreed to accept an Italian unit. With French permission he created the Garibaldi Legion to fight for France. It was enthusiastically joined by members of the Italian Youth Republican Legion, veterans of previous campaigns, Greece and South Africa, Mazzini and trade unionists also joined. Instead of joining the French Army the Paris government insisted that the Garibaldi unit join the French Foreign Legion.

The body of Italian volunteers consisted of approximately 2,114 men and 57 officers, of whom half were migrants living in France, and was built into the 4th Marching Regiment of the 1st Foreign Regiment with the standard uniform of the legionaries, with one small difference, a red shirt the partisans wore under their jacket.

The Legion was briefly trained in Montelimar, Nîmes and Montboucher and then transferred on November 11, 1914, to Mailly, where Lieutenant Colonel Giuseppe Garibaldi II formally took over the command.

Used on the front of the Argonne in risky enterprises and bayonet assaults, the Legion on December 26, 1914, fought in Belle Etoile, near Bois de Bolante, a bloody battle from which the volunteers were victorious. Here Peppino was almost killed, while, his brother, Lieut. Bruno Garibaldi died in the charge. When the Italian public found out it enraged them. After Bruno was killed 300,000 people took part in his January 6, 1915 funeral procession. French, British, Russian, Belgian and Serbian ambassadors were in attendance. The second battle of the Legion in Argonne, took place January 5, 1915 Four-de-Paris, where it suffered heavy casualties including another brother of Peppino, Constantino Garibaldi. During Bruno's funeral, news arrived of Constantino's death.

On May 6, 1915, the Legion, given the general mobilization in Italy, was dissolved and the IV Regiment marched back to Avignon. All Italian legionnaires were then sent back to Italy to fight against the Austrians.

All told from fighting under French command the Garibaldi Legion had 300 dead, 400 injured and a thousand sick. Among the fallen officers December 26, 1914 include: the lieutenant Lamberto Duranti from Ancona; Courtes Chausses ( Lachalade ); Lieutenant Gregory Trombetta from Milan, killed at Bois de Bolante (Lachalade); Lieutenant Paul Muracciole by Gatti-of-Vivarium dead near Le Claon (Lachalade); the lieutenant Pasquale Marino, who died at Bois de Bolante. Among the wounded partisans there was Giuseppe Chiostergi Senigallia, elected deputy in the first parliament of the Italian Republic. Lazare Ponticelli, Italian immigrant in France and volunteer assigned to the Legion Garibaldi, became a French citizen in the 1930s and is remembered in France as le dernier Poilu, the last of the veterans.

=== Timeline ===
- The 4th Marching Regiment of the 1st Foreign Regiment was formed on November 5, 1914, from the depots in Nîmes and Montélimar. Constituted almost entirely of Italians, the regiment included a headquarter staff and three battalions (two battalions from Montélimar and one from Nîmes).
- At creation, the regiment counted 57 Officers, 2114 men and 184 horses.
- From November 10 to December 16, the regiment garrisoned at camp de Mailly under the authority of général de Trocy, commanding the 20th region.
- On December 24, the regiment bivouac at Pierre Croisée and integrated the 10th French Infantry Division (French: 10^{e} Division d'infanterie, 10^{e} D.I) (général Gouraud) of the II^{nd} Armed Corps (général Gérard).
- On December 25, the first and second battalions launched the assaults on the trenches at the plateau of Bolante while unfolding quickly to cover. Losses for the regiment were ( 30 killed out of which 4 Officers, 113 wounded out of which 5 Officers and 18 disappeared ).
- On January 5, the regiment's second battalion launched an assault on the western trenches of Four de Paris; nevertheless, received rapid orders to unfold. During the same day, the regiment's first and third battalion join Chalade and Sapinière and launched another assault against entrenched lines (combat of Courtchausse). Following the apprehending of three trenches by the regiment's two battalions; the 4th Marching Regiment of the 1st Foreign Regiment had to unfold to cover a counter-attack.
- On January 8, the second battalion counter-attacked (combat of cote 285).
- From January 8 to January 9, the first battalion engaged in combat at ravin des Meurissons (111 men where placed out of combat : 15 killed, 42 disappeared, 54 wounded).
- From January 8 to January 10, the third battalion engaged in combat at Pierre Croisée.
- At dissolution on May 5, losses for the 4th Marching Regiment of the 1st Foreign Regiment counted 566 men: 93 killed, 136 disappeared and 337 wounded.

== Traditions ==
Members of the Garibaldi Legion were known to wear a red shirt under their standard uniform.

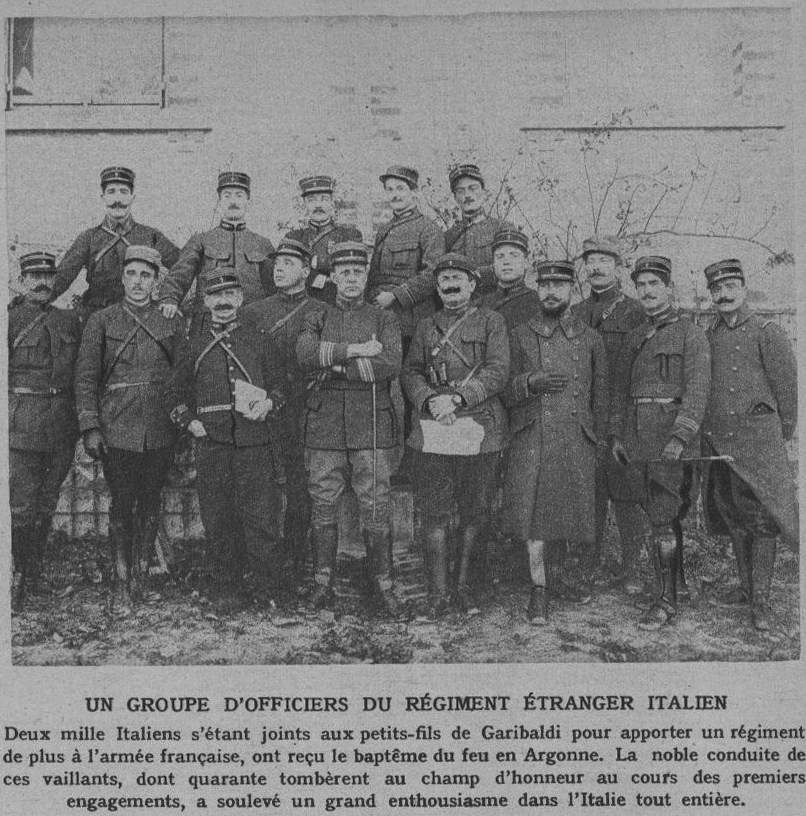
A group of Italian Officers of the 2,000 strong Italian dominated 4th Marching Regiment of the 1st Foreign Regiment. At the center is their regimental Lieutenant-Colonel Peppino Garibaldi. January 1915.

== Regimental Commanders ==
Period 1914-1915
4th Marching Regiment of the 1st Foreign Regiment
4ème R.M.1^{er}R.E

- 1914 - 1915: Lieutenant-Colonel Peppino Garibaldi

== Notable Officers and legionnaires ==
- Italian writer, Curzio Malaparte
- Italian, French naturalized Lazare Ponticelli

== See also ==
- Marching Regiment of the Foreign Legion
- Major (France)
- French Foreign Legion Music Band (MLE)
- Jean de Lattre de Tassigny

== Bibliography ==
Notes

References

- Associated Press (January 7, 1915). "Receives News of Second Death While Funeral Services are Being Held". Anderson Daily Intelligencer. Anderson, Anderson, South Carolina: William Banks. ISSN 2166-9651. OCLC 27828051. Archived from the original on January 5, 2015.
- Fitzwilliam Museum (2015). "Italy and France. The heroic death of Bruno Garibaldi". Fitzwilliam Museum.
- Alaska Daily Empire (January 5, 1914). "Italian Thirst To Get Into War". The Alaska Daily Empire. Juneau, Alaska.
