= Serenidus of Saulges =

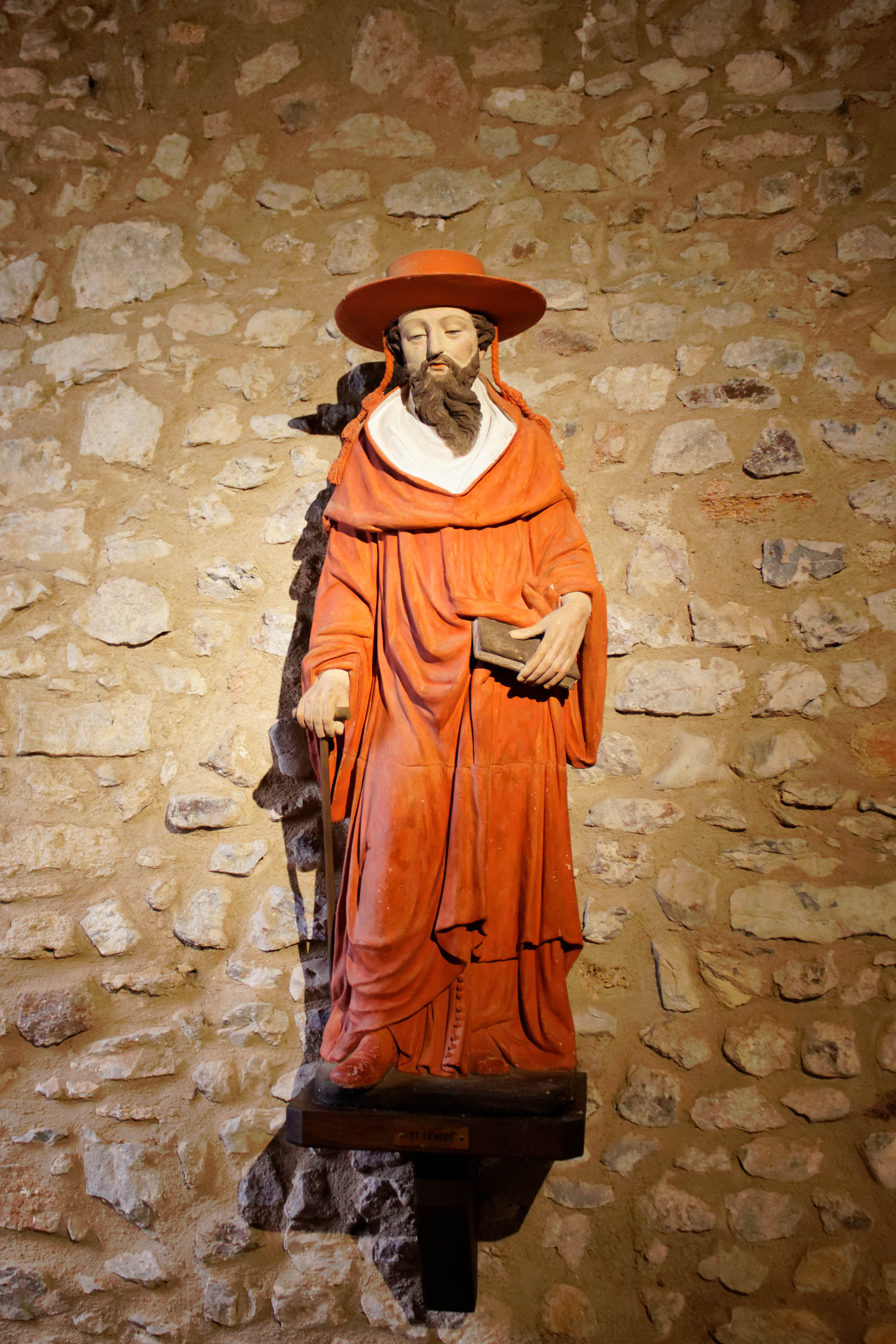
- Statue of Serenidus wearing a cardinals' habit and red galero
- Born: c. 600; Spoleto, Italy
- Died: c. 680 (aged approx. 80); Saulges, France
- Feast: 7 May or 16 August
- Patronage: Saulges, France

Serenidus of Saulges (French: Cénéré de Saulges, also variously spelled Sénéré, Céneré, Sérène, or Sérenède; c. 600 – c. 680) was an Italian Benedictine monk. His feast day is celebrated on 7 May, with his brother Serenicus, or locally on 16 August.

== Background ==
Born into a noble family in Umbria, a contemporary of fellow Umbrian, Martin the Confessor, his family's status could have had him appointed a cardinal-deacon in Rome. Deciding upon a different path, he travelled to the province of Maine in 649 during the reign of the Merovingian king Clovis II with his brother, Serenicus. His goal was to live as a life of secluded prayer-focused life hermit and to preach to the local populations. He was one of a number of evangelizing hermits in Maine (e.g. Saint Longis, Saint Ernier, Saint Fraimbaut, Saint Trèche, Saint Contantien). He is said to have caused a spring to well up on the site of his hermitage. After he died. the spring was venerated and became a pilgrimage site. The chapel was rebuilt in 1849 and called the Oratory of Saint Cénéré near Saulges in the diocese of Le Mans. His relics are kept at the oratory.

He died in 680 following an illness and was initially buried in the Saint Peter's Church, Saulges. In the 8th century his relics were moved to the Cathedral Saint-Maurice in Angers; and were later returned and placed in the church at Saint-Céneré. a reliquary containing a small part of his body is exposed in the north transept of the Saint Peter's church.

== Legends and miracles ==
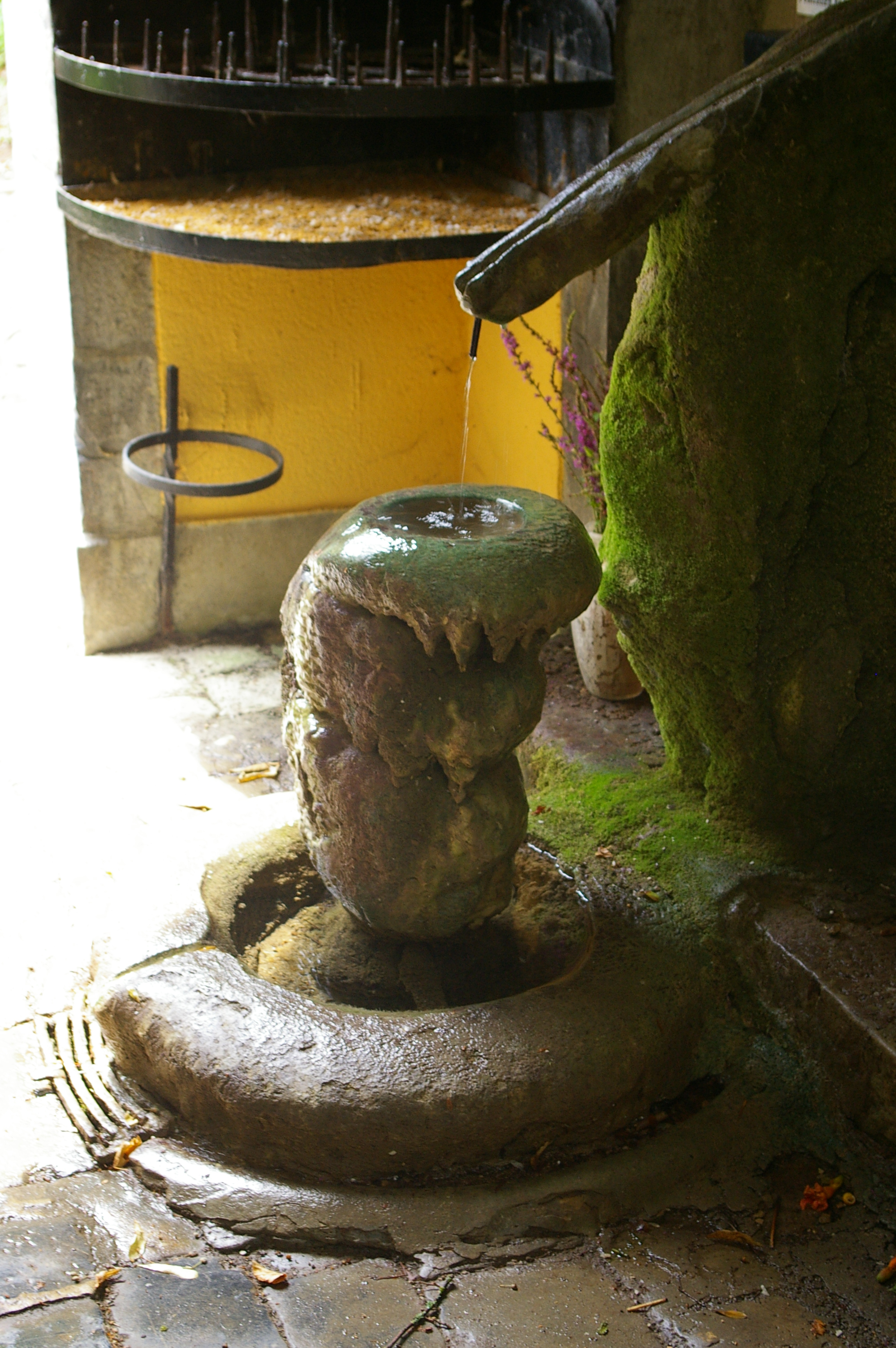
Source of the stream in the oratory

The source of the spring has been venerated, and a pilgrimage site, for more than a millennium. An annual pilgrimage takes place every August around the time of his saint's day. Many pilgrims come to venerate the relics of the saint in Saulges and see the miraculous spring that Serenidus is said to have caused to flow.

There are legends about the spring: in one of them, a young pagan girl going to offer a libation to a water deity stopped to talk to Serenidus; as he prayed for her a tear from his eye fell on the ground, creating a hole that brought forth the spring. In another legend, an unbeliever blocked the flow of the spring with a stick. Upon returning home he was seized with violent pains and prevented from urinating; his illness ceased when returning to the hermitage he unblocked the source. From these legends the spring is nicknamed "the little pissing saint."

Serenidus had a reputation as a miracle worker, he healed a leper with prayer, he gave sight to a blind man with the sign of the cross. His hagiography also reports that at the request of the Bishop of Le Mans, Berecharius, he saved the countryside from a drought, a famine and an epidemic.

== Impact ==
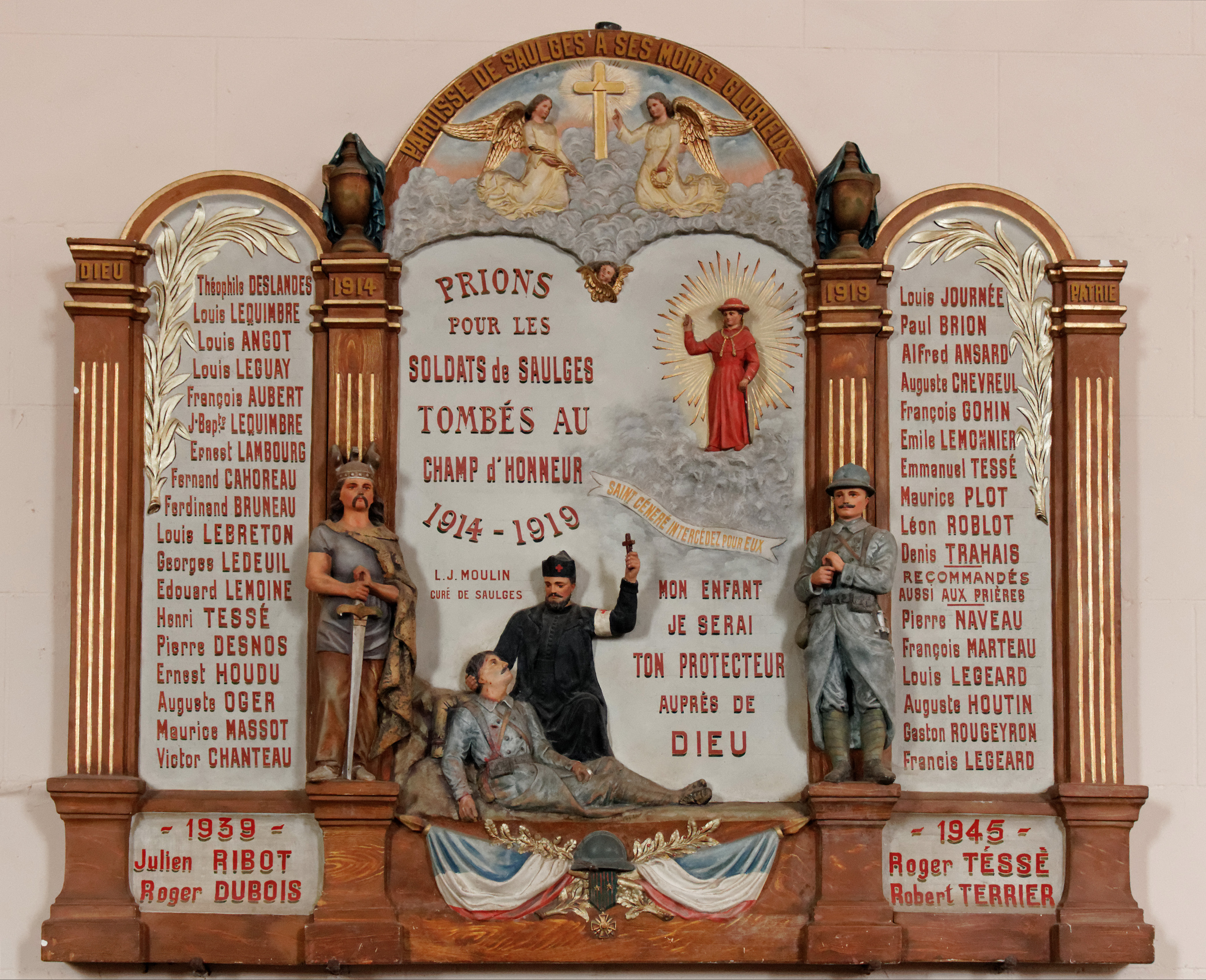
Commemorative plaque of the soldiers of Saulges who died during the world wars

Serenidus is influential locally. Many representations of the saint are seen throughout Mayenne, Sarthe and Maine-et-Loire, both as statues or paintings. Serenidus is portrayed wearing a cardinal's habit. There is bas-relief in the Cathedral Saint-Maurice in Angers where his relics were once housed.

He is also found in a commemorative plaque of the soldiers of Saulges who died during the world wars found in the Notre Dame de Saulges church (pictured).

== Gallery ==
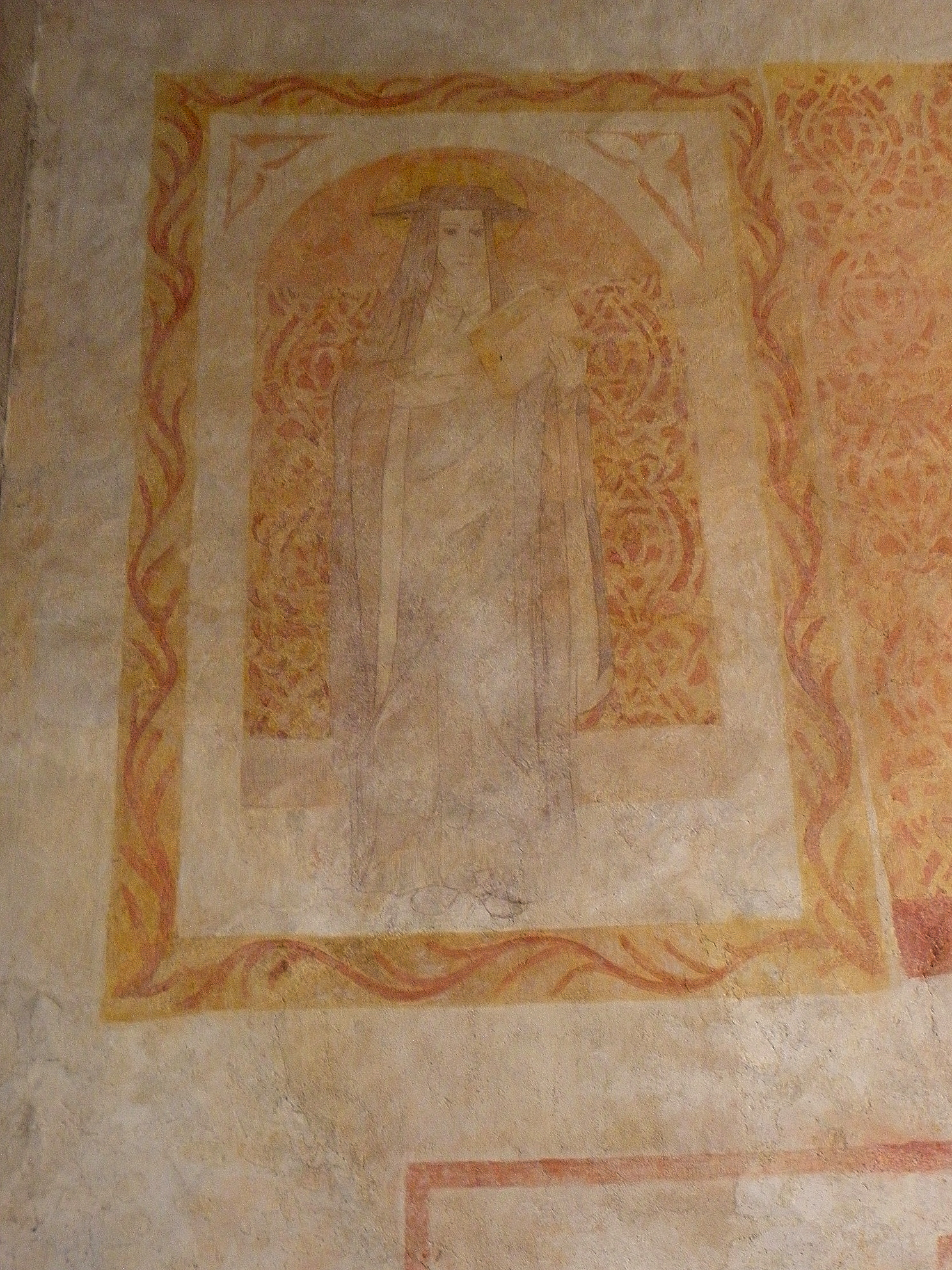
Fresco, chapel of Saint Peter, 16th century

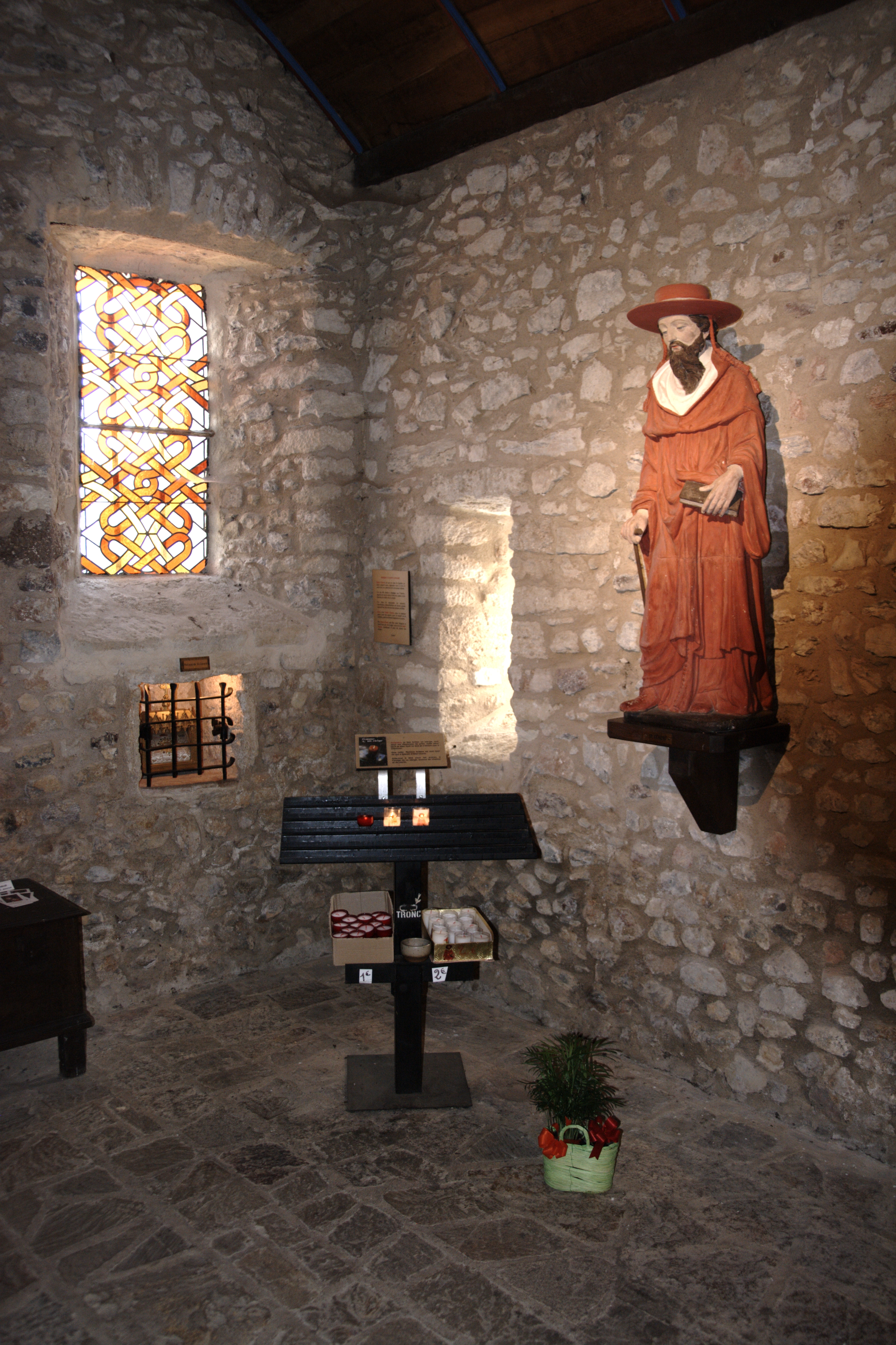
Terracotta, chapel of Saint Peter north transept 17th century

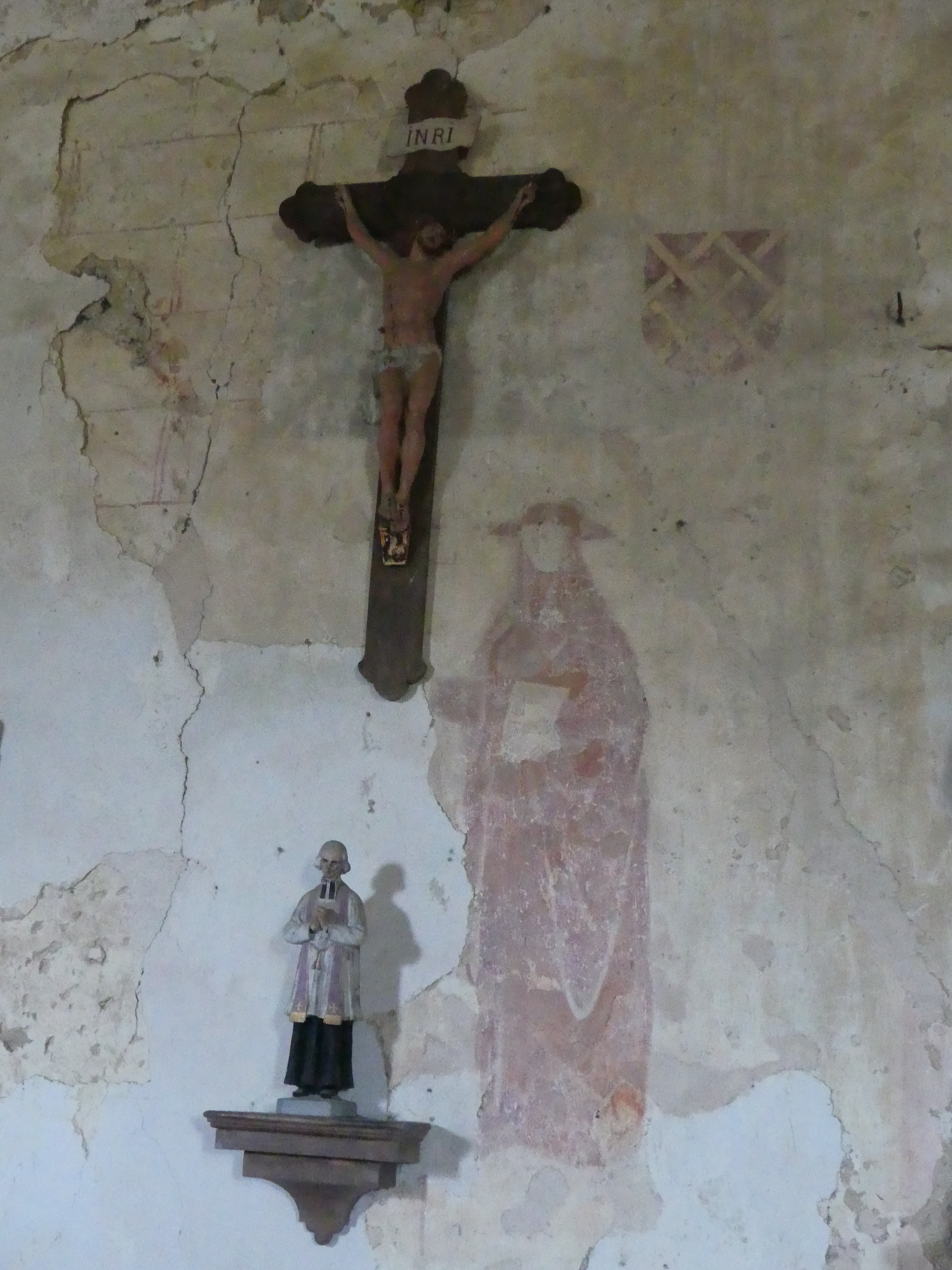
Fresco, chapel of Saint Martin de Villenglose circa 13th century

== See also ==
- Oratory of Saint Cénéré
- Église Saint-Pierre de Saulges
