= Oratory of Saint Cénéré =

Oratory in Mayenne, France

- Oratoire de Saint-Céneré
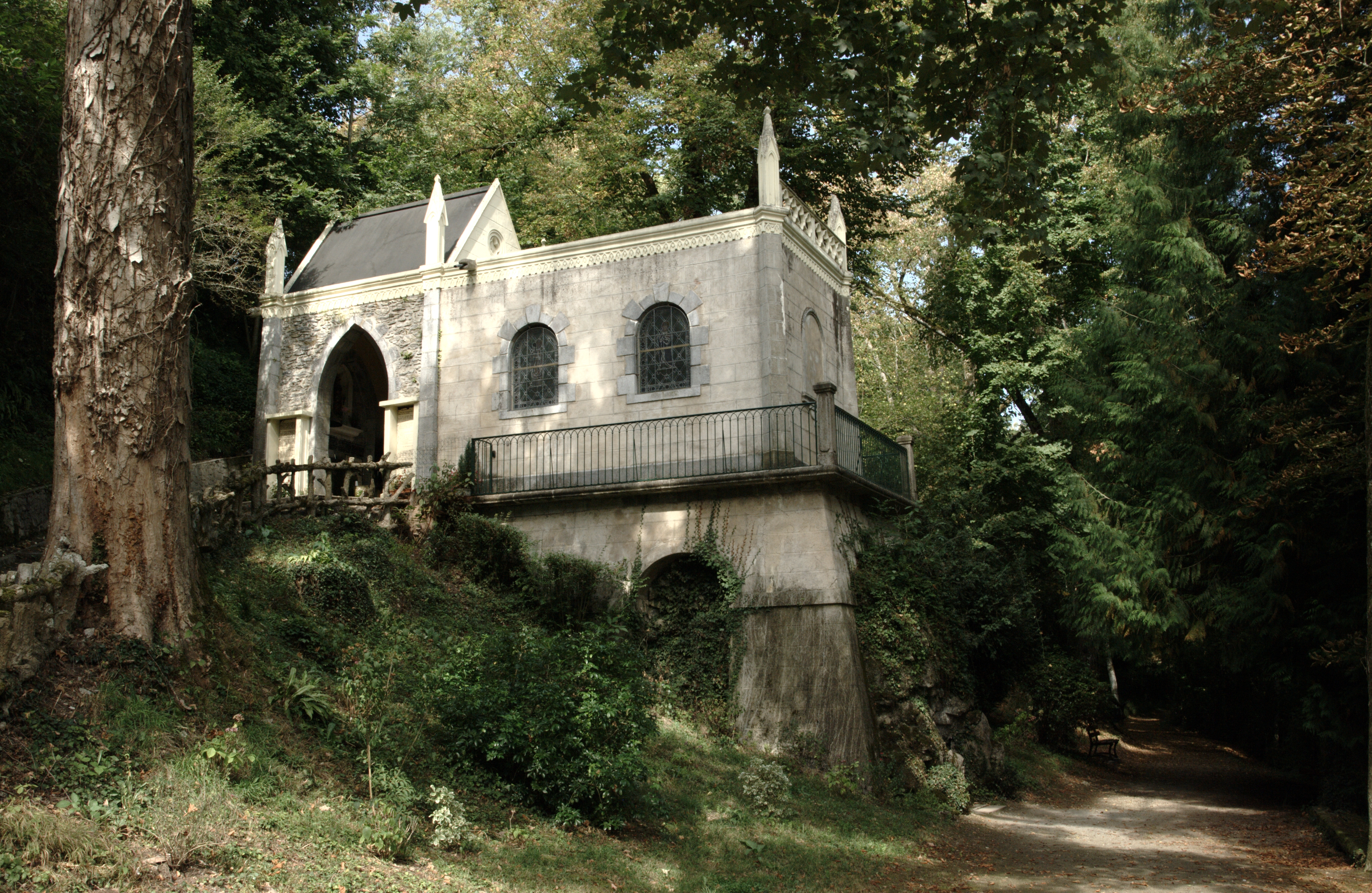
- The 1849 oratory completed in 1933
- Oratory of Saint Cénéré
- 47.9833°N 0.4044°W
- Location: Saulges (Mayenne)
- Country: France
- Denomination: Catholic

History
- Status: Oratory
- Founded: 7th century
- Founder: Cénéré of Saulges

Architecture
- Functional status: Active
- Style: Medieval
- Completed: 1933

Administration
- Diocese: Diocese of Laval

The Oratory of Saint Cénéré (French for Oratoire de Saint-Céneré) is an oratory in the village of Saulges, in the municipality of Saulges in the Mayenne department, France.

== History ==
The oratory takes its name from Saint Céneré (or Cerenico), a Benedictine monk born in Spoleto in the 7th century; he was sent by Pope Martin I to preach in Merovingian Gaul with his brother, Serenicus, and with him he arrived in the diocese of Le Mans, in Saulges, around 649–650. He founded a Christian community which built the Saint Peter's Church, Saulges.

The cave served as a hermitage for the monk. The oratory, located 1 kilometre (0.62 mi) from the town, was built in 1849 to protect the statue of the saint. The chapel is located where Céneré is said to have caused a spring to issue from the rock. The oratory was rebuilt in stone in 1849 by the Marquis de la Rochelambert, who owned the land, with the assistance of the Saulges factory. The factory became the owner in 1860 when Montguyon was sold to Adrien Rousseau of Montfrand. The grotto was outfitted in 1903 and the east building was added in 1933.

== Architecture ==
Access to the oratory is facilitated by two stairways leaning against the hill; the nave that extends the chapel is covered by a roof terrace. The interior of the chapel is decorated with a painting attributed to Adeline Neveu, which depicts Céneré healing the blind and the paralyzed; four stained glass windows from the end of the 19th century came from the dismantling of the Plessis chapel and represent the Sacred Heart, the Virgin, Saint Joseph and Saint Alexander. They were made by the Carmel workshop in Le Mans.

In the cave below, the 18th-century statue of Saint Cénéré in polychrome wood, restored in 2005, surmounts the spring described by Grosse Dupéron. This continuous stream of water has given Saint Cèneré the nickname "the saint who pees" or "the little pissing saint."

== Gallery ==
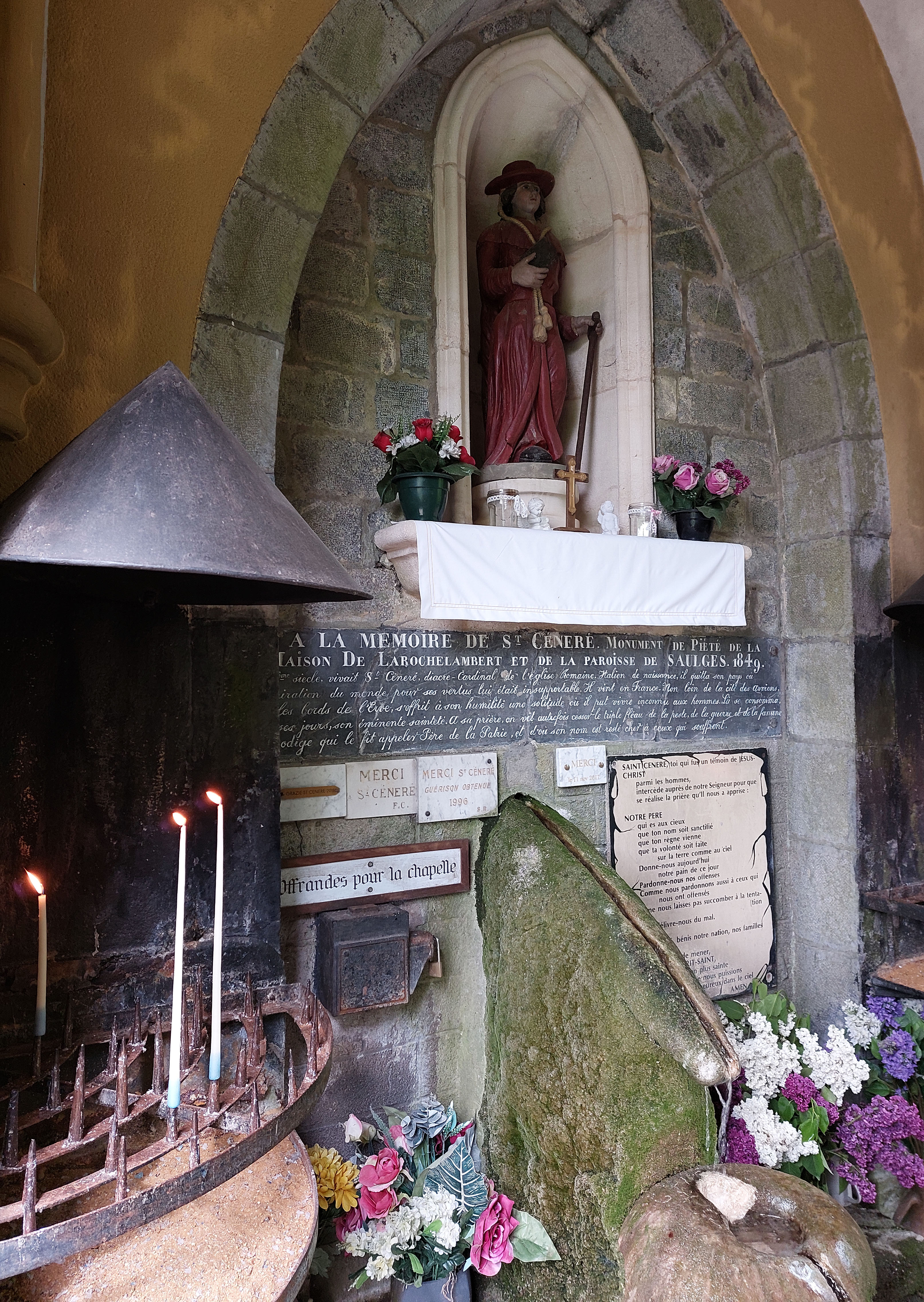
The spring as seen by visitors

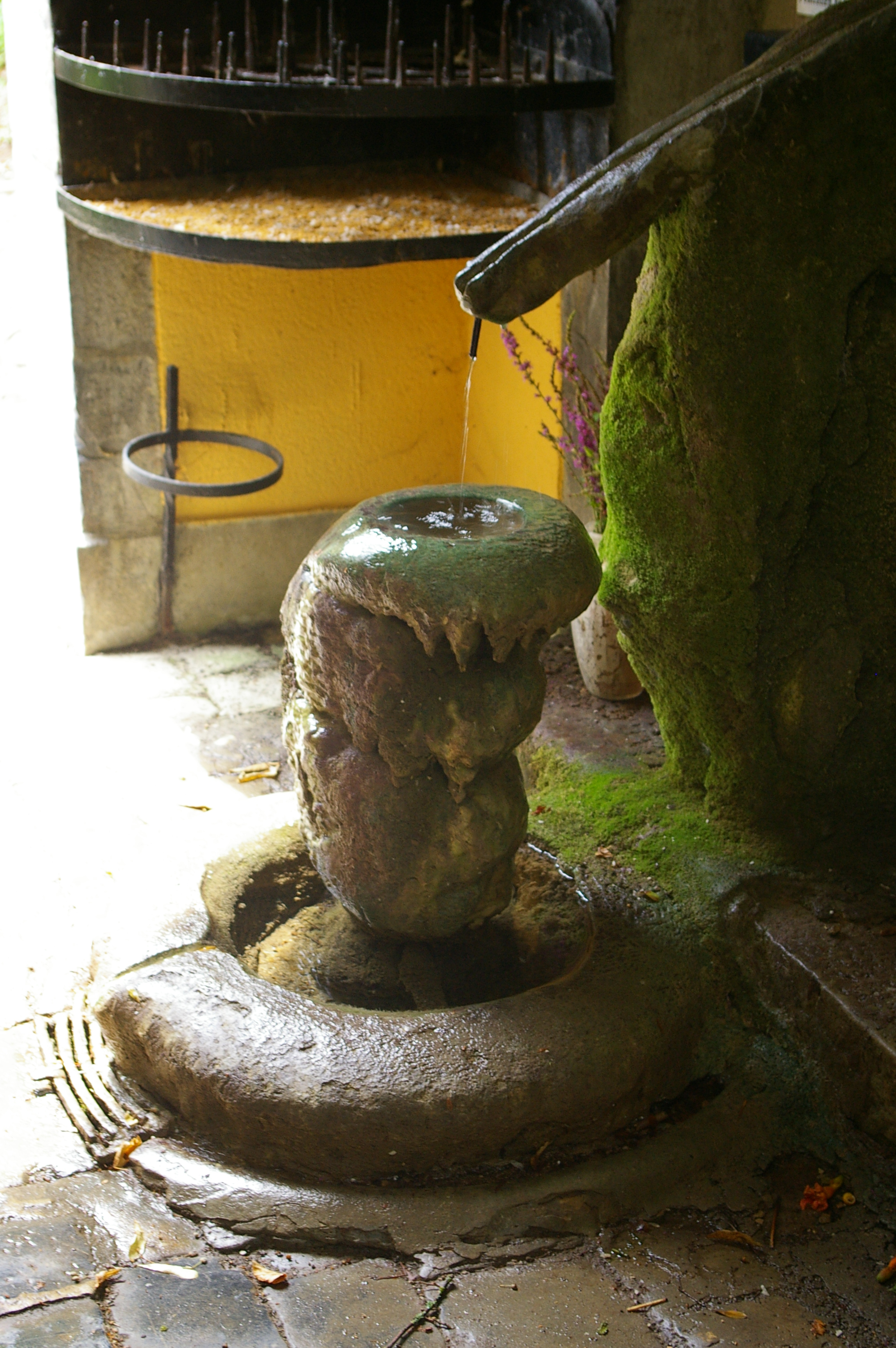
Other side of the spring.
