= Mayenne (disambiguation) =

Mayenne is a department of France in Pays de la Loire.

Mayenne may also refer to:

- Mayenne (commune), a town in the department
- Mayenne (river), France
- Charles, Duke of Mayenne, leader of the Catholic League against Henry IV of France
