= Greece in the Balkan Wars =

War lasting from 1912 until 1913

The participation of Greece in the Balkan Wars of 1912–1913 is one of the most important episodes in modern Greek history, as it allowed the Greek state to almost double its size and achieve most of its present territorial size. It also served as a catalyst of political developments, as it brought to prominence two personalities, whose relationship would dominate the next decade and have long-lasting repercussions for Greece: the Prime Minister Eleftherios Venizelos, and the Army's commander-in-chief, the Crown Prince and later King, Constantine I.

In the First Balkan War, Greece was allied with Bulgaria, Serbia and Montenegro in the "Balkan League" against the Ottoman Empire. The war began on 8 October [O.S. 25 September] 1912 with the declaration of war by Montenegro, while Greece, Bulgaria and Serbia joined on 17 October [O.S. 4 October] 1912. During this war, Greece fought on two fronts on land, and also shouldered the main naval effort of the Balkan allies. The initial principal thrust on land was by the Army of Thessaly, which succeeded in occupying much of Macedonia, including the strategically important port of Thessaloniki, the latter just hours ahead of a Bulgarian division; this would result in increased tension between the two allies in the coming months, and would be one of the causes of the Second Balkan War. Following the successful conclusion of operations in Macedonia, the Greek Army shifted its weight to the Epirus front, where, after a prolonged siege, the city of Ioannina fell, and the Greeks advanced into Northern Epirus (modern southern Albania). In the Aegean Sea, the Greek Navy took possession of all the Aegean islands except for the Italian-occupied Dodecanese, and fought off two attempts by the Ottoman Navy to sally forth from the Dardanelles.

Although negotiations had started in London in December 1912, the war continued until 30 May [O.S. 17 May] 1913, when the Treaty of London was finally signed. The treaty failed to satisfy any party involved, with the chief point of friction being the partition of Macedonia. In the face of Bulgarian claims, Serbia and Greece formed an alliance, and on the evening of 29 June [O.S. 16 June] 1913, Bulgarian forces launched a surprise attack against their erstwhile allies. The Bulgarian attacks were soon contained, and pushed back. For Greece in particular, the battles of the Second Balkan War were very costly, as the Greek Army pushed its way into Bulgaria. Following the entry of Romania and the Ottoman Empire in the war, the Bulgarian position became hopeless, and an armistice was declared on 30 July. The war was concluded with the Treaty of Bucharest on 10 August 1913, which confirmed the Greek gains of Macedonia, Epirus (without Northern Epirus) and Crete.

== Background ==
=== The rise of nationalism in the Balkans ===
The Balkan Wars must be regarded within the context of the rising Balkan nationalisms during the 19th century, which ran counter to the established Ottoman religion-based millet system. Inspired by the theories of nationalism as expounded in contemporary France, Germany and Italy, Balkan intellectual elites sought to awaken the national consciousness of their compatriots and advocated the creation of ethnically homogeneous nation-states. The first states to be formed out of the Ottoman Empire were Serbia (as an autonomous principality in 1804–1817) and Greece (as a fully independent kingdom in 1821–1832), in both cases following protracted wars. In both cases also, the new states formed only a fraction of the lands claimed as belonging to the respective nations. In the Greek case, fully three quarters of all Greeks still lived under Ottoman rule, and the drive to liberate their "unredeemed" brethren became known as the Megali Idea, first articulated by the Greek Prime Minister Ioannis Kolettis before Parliament in 1844:

The Kingdom of Greece is not Greece. It constitutes only one part, the smallest and feeblest. The name Hellenes describes not only those who live in this kingdom, but also those who live in Jannina, in Thessaloniki, in Serres, in Adrianople, in Constantinople, in Trebizond, in Crete, in Samos and any territory associated with Hellenic history and the Hellenic race. [...] there are two prime cores of Hellenism: Athens, the capital of the Hellenic Kingdom, and the City [Constantinople] the vision and hope of all Hellenes.

Kolettis thus united the nascent Greek state, which initially had hearkened back mostly to the glories of Classical Greece, with the vision of a restored Byzantine Empire. The process of restoring the Byzantine Empire as an integral part of Greek national consciousness, and consequently claiming its cultural and territorial heritage, was carried out by Greece's "national historian", Constantine Paparrigopoulos.

Likewise, Serbia sought to revive the empire of Stefan Dusan, and the latecomers in the Balkan nation-building, the Bulgarians, the medieval Bulgarian Empires. Following the Treaty of San Stefano in 1877, this "greater Bulgaria" seemed to be realized, but was reduced drastically in the subsequent Treaty of Berlin, which also ceded Thessaly to Greece. This episode however made clear that the Balkan nationalisms were mutually competitive, and nowhere was this competition clearer than in the great region that lay between the three states, Macedonia.

=== Macedonia ===
Macedonia was inhabited by a dense mixture of nationalities, including Greeks, Bulgarians, Serbs, Vlachs, Turks and other Balkan Muslims, Albanians, and featured even a large community of Sephardic Jews, who were the dominant element in the region's major city, Thessaloniki. All countries with minorities in the region tried to make progress at the expense of the others, funding schools and publishing ethnographic statistics and maps that supported their claims.

Comparative statistics on the population of Macedonia
	Bulgarian estimate (1900)	Serbian estimate (1900)	Greek estimate (1904)	Ottoman estimate (1905)
Total population	2,190,520	2,880,420	1,711,607	1,824,032
Bulgarians	1,179,036	57,600	332,162	352,788
Greeks	225,152	unknown	650,709	625,889
Serbs	700	2,048,320	unknown	unknown
Turks (Muslims)	564,158	unknown	634,017	745,155

In the late 1890s, the antagonism for Macedonia, hitherto mostly confined to a cultural and propaganda war, entered a new phase, as the pro-Bulgarian Internal Macedonian Revolutionary Organization, founded in 1893, initiated an armed guerrilla campaign against the Ottomans. Following the Ilinden Uprising, the Bulgarian efforts were countered by Serb and Greek armed groups, in what is known as the "Macedonian Struggle" in Greece. These armed bands functioned as the military wing of national committees that carried out an intensive campaign of cultural assimilation amongst the rural populace, funding schools and orphanages, among other things. Sporadic fighting took place between Bulgarian komitadjis, Greek andartes and Ottoman gendarmes. Looting, arson and assassinations were commonplace, as each side sought to intimidate the other's supporters. The clashes ended only with the outbreak of the Young Turk Revolution in 1908, which promised equality to all Ottoman subjects.

=== Ottoman instability ===
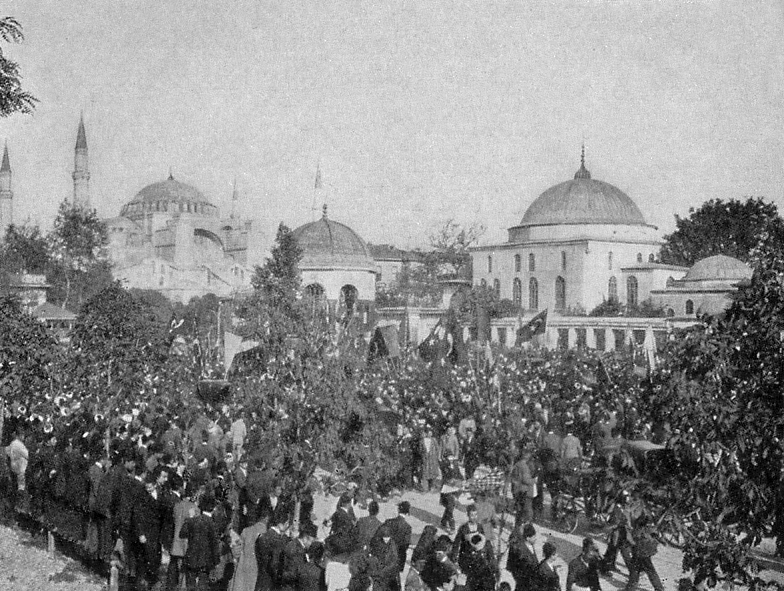
Demonstration against the Sultan in Constantinople, 1908

The Young Turk Revolution ushered a period of instability in the region. Seizing the opportunity, Bulgaria unilaterally declared its full independence, Austria-Hungary annexed Bosnia and Herzegovina, angering the Serbs and Russians, while Crete also declared its union (enosis) with Greece, although the latter was not formalized. Initially, the liberal promises of the Young Turks caused much enthusiasm both inside the Empire and in the Balkan states, but they gradually adopted a policy of forced "Ottomanisation", which, coupled with the parallel rise of Albanian nationalism, threatened the interests of the other Balkan states. Italy too, in search of a colonial empire, took advantage of the turmoil in the Ottoman Empire, attacking Libya and seizing the Dodecanese islands during the Italo-Turkish War. The Italians promised to cede the Greek-inhabited Dodecanese islands to Greece, but in the end kept them. This aroused indignation in Greece. Coupled with Bulgarian aspirations for Macedonia and Austrian designs on Thessaloniki, it made clear that, if Greece did not want to be left out of the Ottoman spoils, it had to act. Nevertheless, the new Greek Prime Minister, Eleftherios Venizelos, hesitated to act alone, not only because of the bitter memories of the disastrous war of 1897, but also because the large Greek populations inside Ottoman territory might be exposed to reprisals.

=== Creation of the Balkan League ===
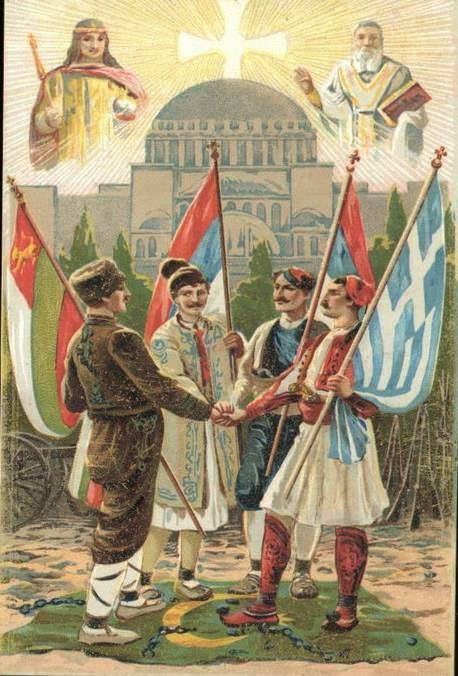
The Balkan League was formed in 1912 with Russian support.

Spurred by the Ottomans' entanglement with Italy, Serbia and Bulgaria accelerated their negotiations for an alliance; however, their differences proved difficult to overcome, and only pressure from the Russian government, which was eager to regain ground in the Balkans, led to the signing of a treaty of alliance on 7 March [O.S. 23 February] 1912. It was ostensibly directed against Austria-Hungary, but it also envisaged a partition of European Turkey: Albania and Kosovo to Serbia, Thrace to Bulgaria; southern Macedonia would be received by Bulgaria, while its northern part would be partitioned between the two under the arbitration of the Russian Tsar. Feelers about a rapprochement and an alliance had also been put forward to Bulgaria by Venizelos in early 1911, but not until after the conclusion of the Serbian-Bulgarian pact did negotiations commence in earnest. Bulgaria, the "Prussia of the Balkans", had the region's strongest army, and in light of the 1897 debacle, the Greek army was held in low esteem. But Greece could offer its navy, which alone could prevent Ottoman reinforcements from being transported from Asia directly to the European fronts. As the Greek ambassador to Sofia noted: "Greece can provide 600,000 men for the war effort. 200,000 men in the field, and the fleet will be able to stop 400,000 men being landed by Turkey between Salonica and Gallipoli." A treaty of defensive alliance was thus signed at Sofia on 29 May [O.S. 16 May] 1912. Unlike the treaty with Serbia, no provisions were made for the division of territory, primarily because the Bulgarians assumed that their army would seize most of its aims before the Greeks got there.

== First Balkan War ==
=== Opposing forces ===
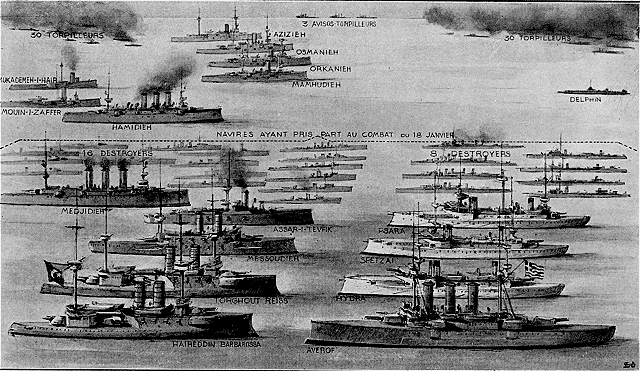
Diagram by the French L'Illustration, depicting the Greek and Ottoman fleets and the warships that participated in the Battle of Lemnos (1913)

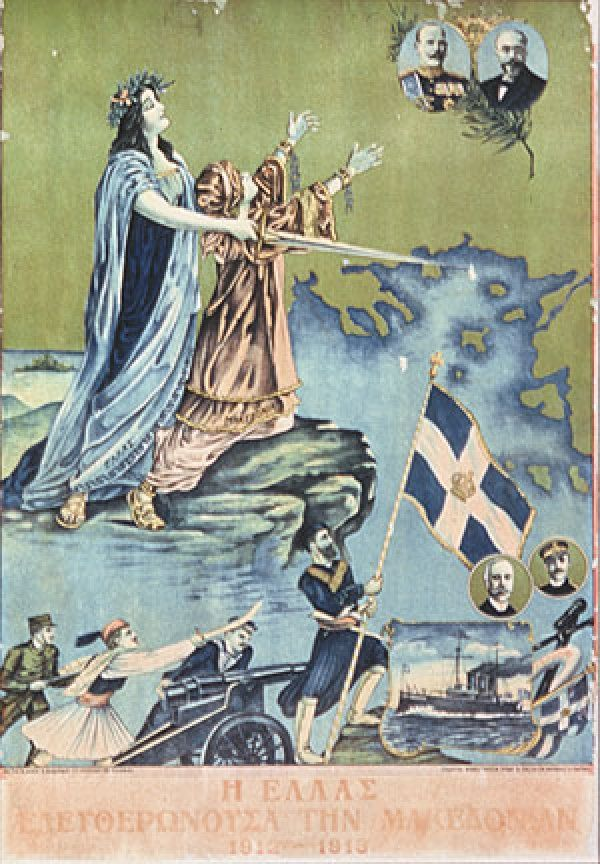
Greek war poster

The various Balkan armies shared many similarities: they were organized along Western European lines, with a General Staff (except for Montenegro) staffed by officers educated abroad, a divisional structure, and were equipped with European arms, chiefly of French or German origin. Their backbone was the infantry, composed mostly of conscripted peasants, while their officers hailed chiefly from the middle classes. Among the Balkan nations, only Greece possessed a considerable navy, while Bulgaria was limited to a few torpedo boats to guard its Black Sea coast.

==== Greece ====
Greece had a peacetime army of ca. 25,000 men, which, upon mobilization on 30 September [O.S. 17 September] 1912 grew to an overall strength of 110,000 men. This was divided into two major armies: the Army of Thessaly (Στρατός Θεσσαλίας), commanded by the Crown Prince Constantine, which would strike in the direction of Macedonia, and the Army of Epirus (Στρατός Ηπείρου) under Lieutenant General Konstantinos Sapountzakis, which would strike in the direction of Epirus. The Army of Thessaly comprised seven infantry divisions, four independent Evzones battalions, a cavalry brigade and various support units, as well as four Farman aircraft, a total of 100,000 men, 70 machine guns and 120 artillery pieces, with 80,000 in the field. The Army of Epirus was of divisional strength, being composed of 8 infantry and one Evzones battalions, one cavalry company and 24 field guns, with a total of ca. 10,000 men. It was later reinforced by a Cretan volunteer regiment and by a corps of Garibaldini volunteers led by Giuseppe Garibaldi II, reaching some 13,000 men.

Greek infantry divisions fielded three infantry regiments, one or two artillery battalions, and a cavalry-half-company for reconnaissance duties. Recently reorganized by a French military mission, the army was equipped with the Mannlicher–Schönauer rifle, and French artillery guns, chiefly the Canon de 75 modèle 1897 and the Schneider-Danglis mountain gun.

==== Ottoman Empire ====
On the other side of the hill, the Ottomans, reorganized by a German military mission, had won a clear victory over Greece back in 1897. Following the Young Turk Revolution however, the Ottoman army became involved in politics to the detriment of its efficiency.

==== Gallery ====
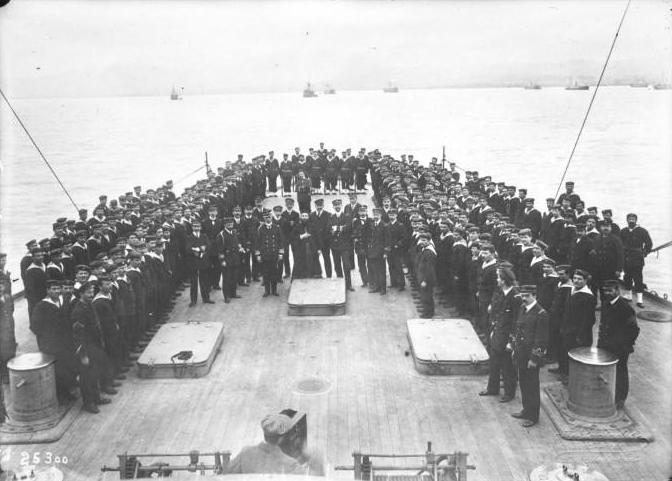
Admiral Pavlos Kountouriotis and the crew of Averof, 1912

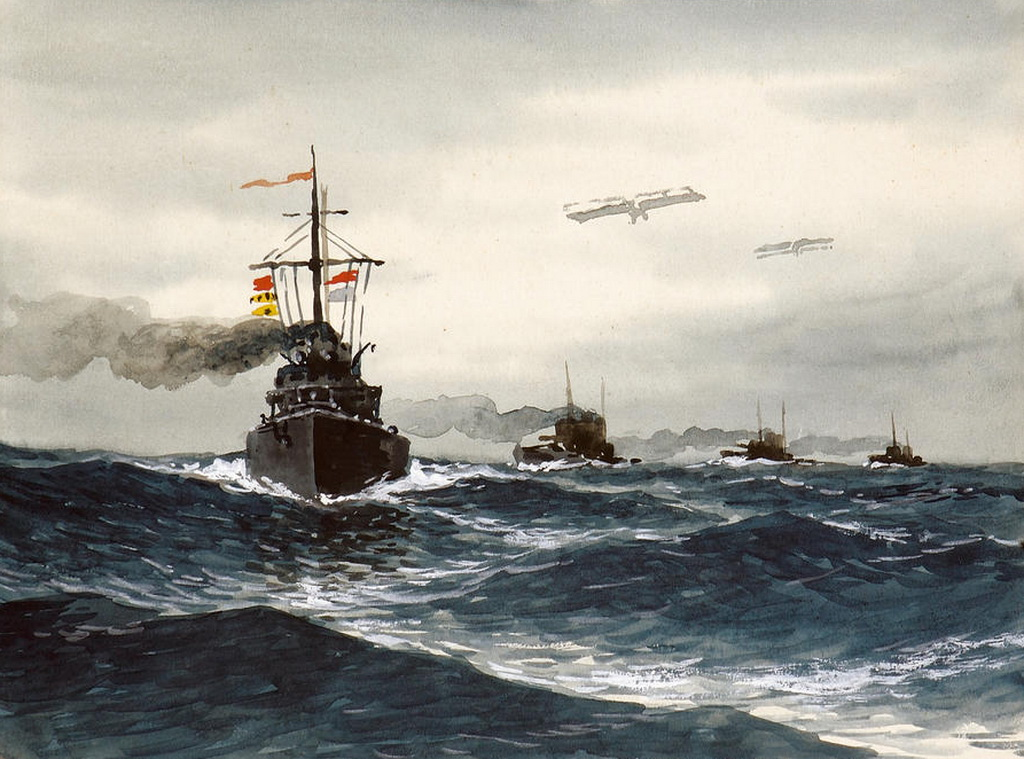
"Greek fleet" by Miltiadis Thon (1912)

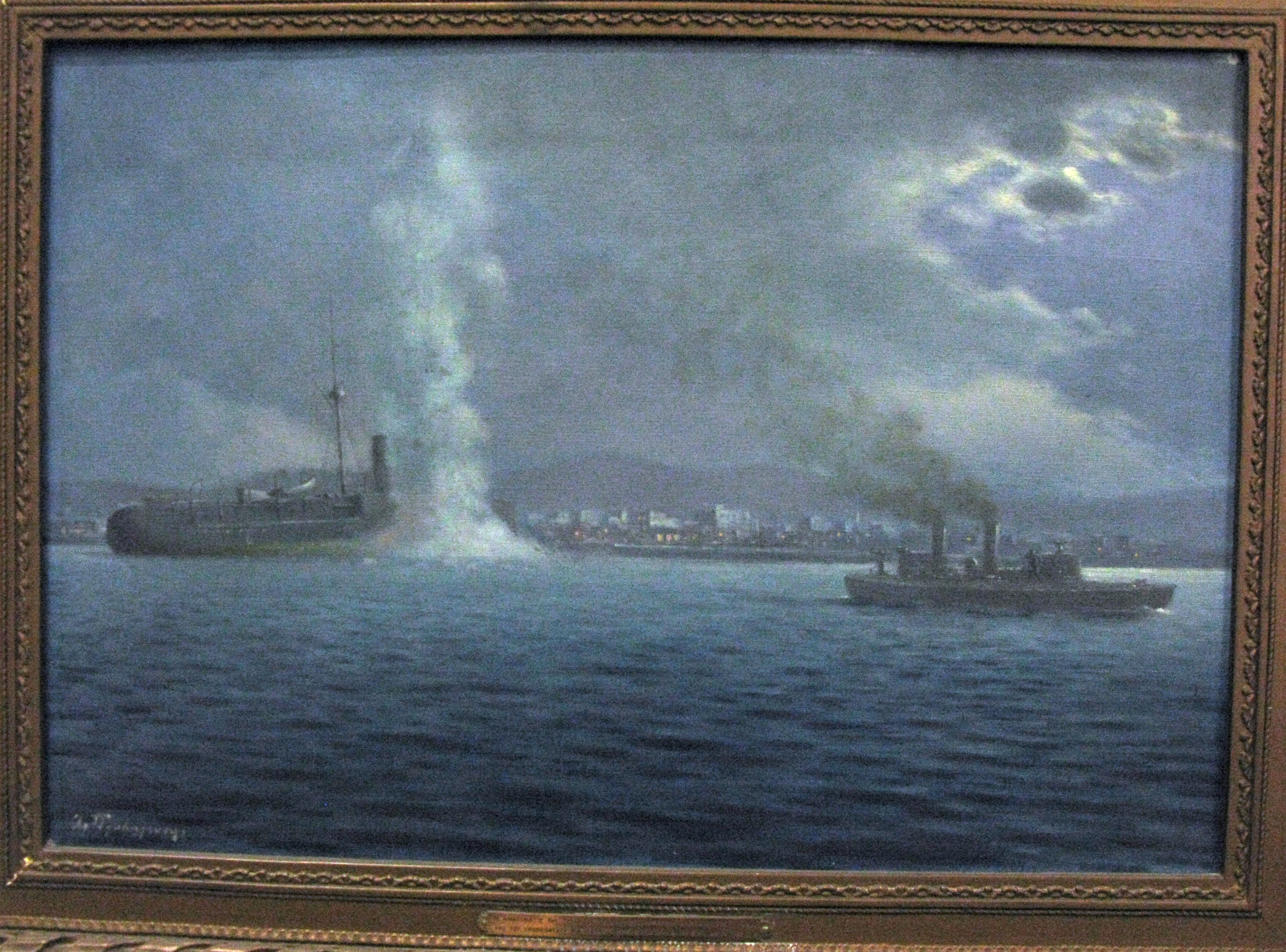
Depiction of the sinking of the "Feth-i Bülend" at the port of Thessaloniki by Admiral Nikolaos Votsis

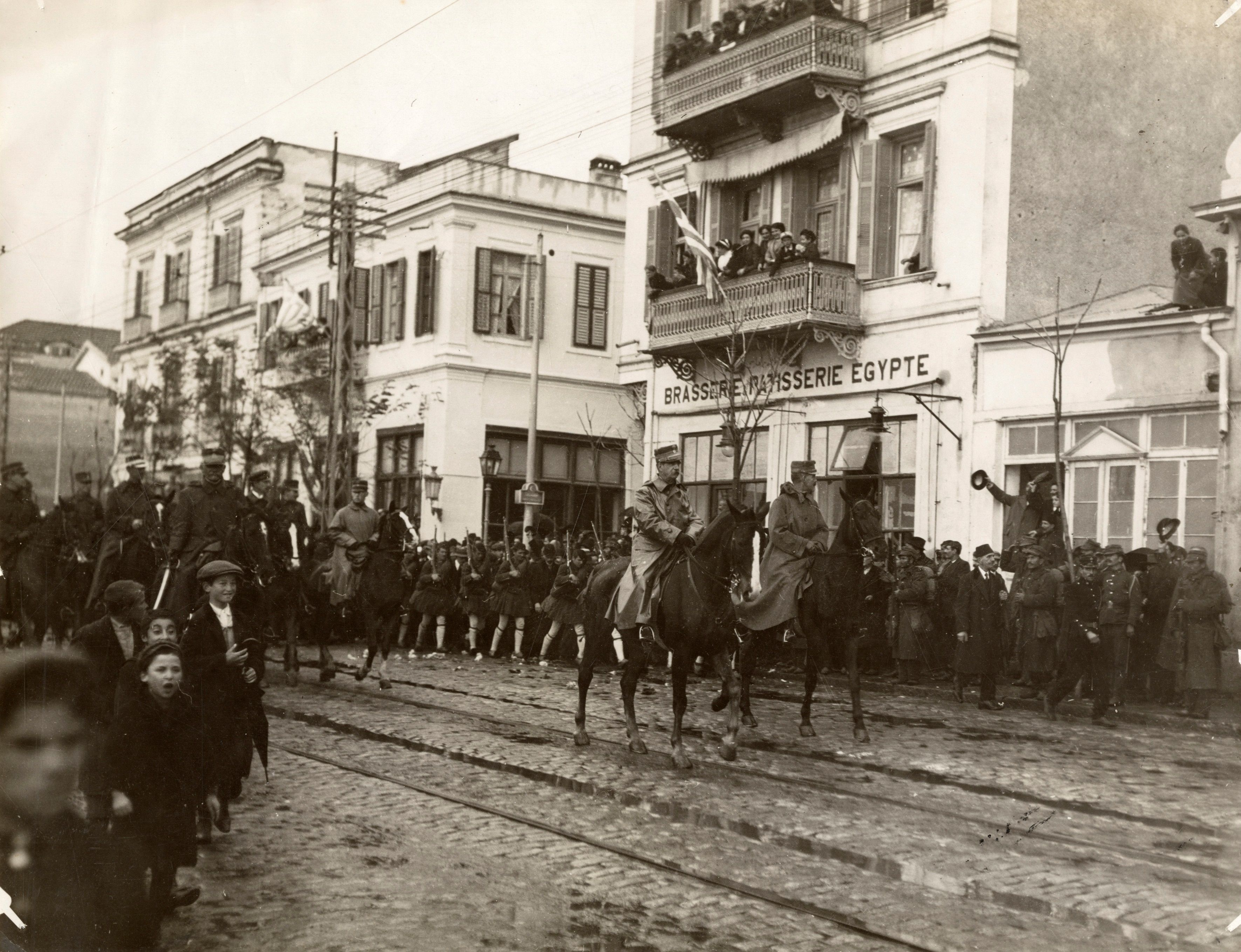
The entry of Constantine I of Greece with George I of Greece and the Greek army in Thessaloniki

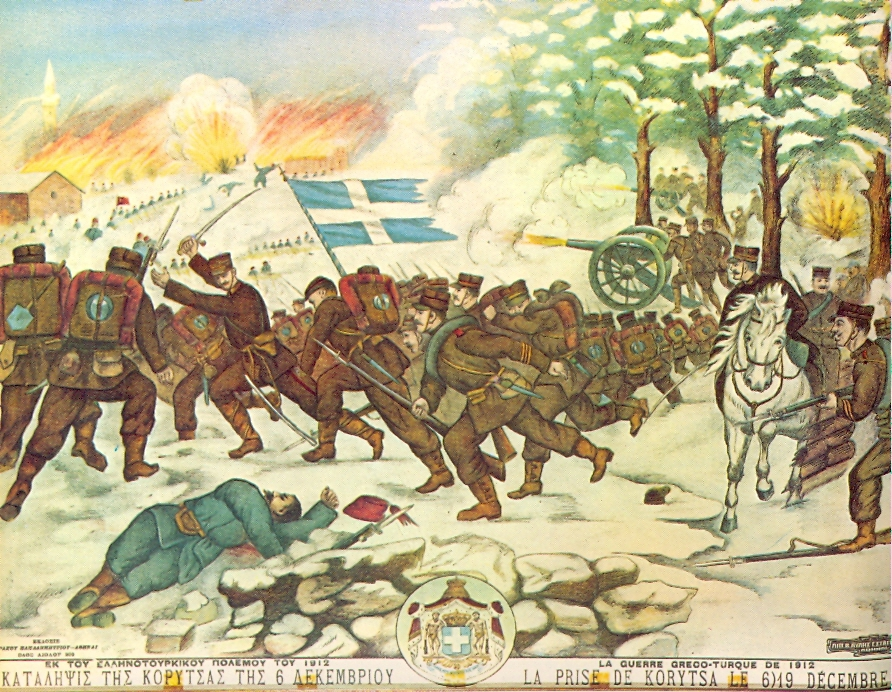
Capture of Korytsa

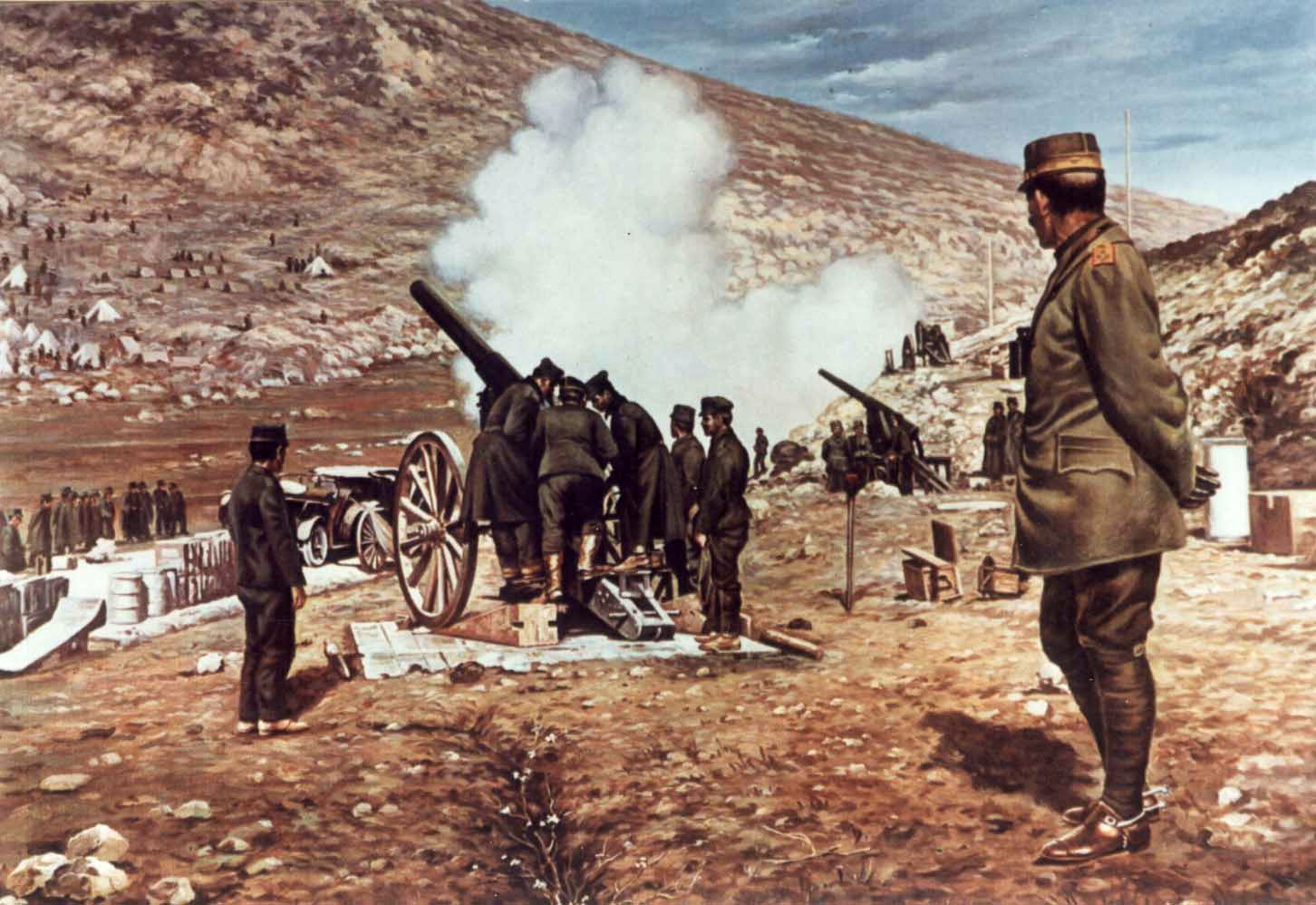
Crown Prince Constantine I watching the heavy guns shelling Bizani, by Georges Scott, during the Battle of Bizani

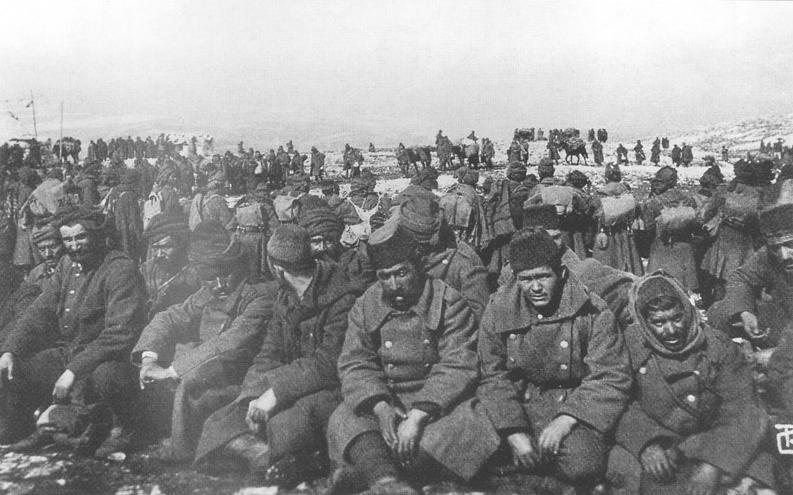
After the battle of Bizani the Greek Army captured ca. 8,600 POWs.

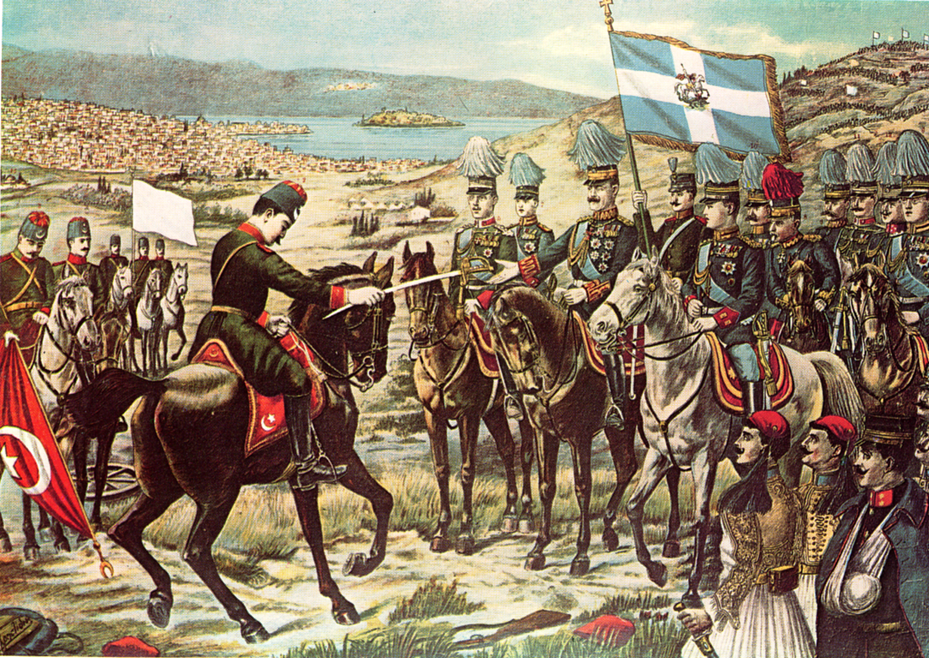
The surrender of Ioannina to Constantine

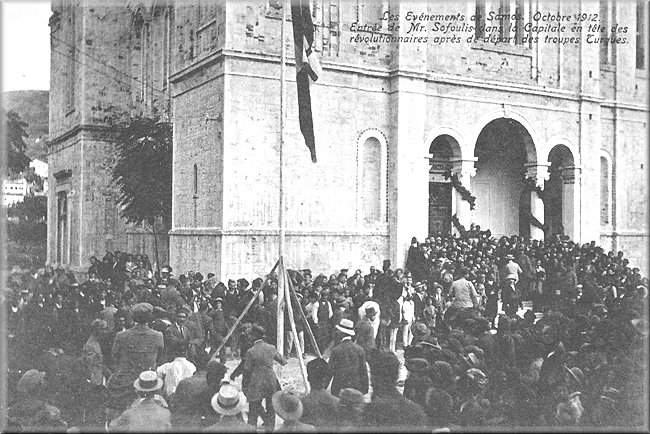
The union of Samos with the Kingdom of Greece

== Aftermath - the impact of the wars on Greece ==
After the wars Greece nearly doubled in territorial holdings; this led to the expansion of the economy using Macedonian industry and resources.

The French military mission proposed additional reforms after studying its performance in the wars notably the creation of five new army corps.

== Sources ==
=== General history ===
- Hellenic Army General Staff, Army History Directorate (1998), An Index of events in the military history of the Greek nation, Athens, ISBN 960-7897-27-7
- Clogg, Richard (1992), A Concise History of Greece, Cambridge University Press, ISBN 0-521-37830-3
- Contogeorgis, Georges (1992), Histoire de la Grèce, Nations d'Europe (in French), Hatier, ISBN 2-218-03841-2
- Dalègre, Joëlle (2002), Grecs et Ottomans - 1453-1923, de la chute de Constantinople à la disparition de l'Empire ottoman (in French), L'Harmattan, ISBN 2-7475-2162-1
- Driault, Edouard; Lheritier, Michel (1926), Histoire diplomatique de la Grèce de 1821 à nos jours (in French), vol. IV & V, Paris: PUF
- Svoronos, Nicholas (1964), Histoire de la Grèce moderne, Que Sais-Je? (in French), PUF
- Terrades, Marc (2005), Le Drame de l'hellénisme. Ion Dragoumis (1878-1920) et la question nationale en Grèce au début du XXe siècle (in French), L'Harmattan, ISBN 2-7475-7788-0
- Trencsényi, Balázs; Kopecek, Michal (eds.) (2007), Discourses of Collective Identity in Central and Southeast Europe 1770–1945, Vol. II: National Romanticism – The Formation of National Movements, Central European University Press, ISBN 978-963-7326-60-8
- Koliopoulos, J.S.; Veremis, Thanos M. (2002), Greece, The Modern Sequel: From 1831 to the Present, London: Hurst & Company, ISBN 1-85065-463-8
- Vacalopoulos, Apostolos (1975), Histoire de la Grèce moderne (in French), Horvath, ISBN 2-7171-0057-1
- Woodhouse, Christopher Montague (1999), Modern Greece: A Short History, Faber and Faber, ISBN 0-571-19794-9

=== On the Balkan Wars ===
- Ιστορία του Ελληνικού Έθνους, Τόμος ΙΔ': Νεώτερος Ελληνισμός από το 1881 ως το 1913 ("History of the Hellenic Nation, Vol. XIV: Modern Hellenism from 1881 to 1913") (in Greek), Εκδοτική Αθηνών, 1977, pp. 280–354
- Cassavetti, Demetrius John (1914), Hellas and the Balkan Wars, London: T. F. Unwin, hdl:10111/UIUCBB:cassade0001helbal
- Hellenic Army General Staff, Army History Directorate (1998), A Concise History of the Balkan Wars, 1912-1913, Athens, ISBN 960-7897-07-2
- Erickson, Edward J.; Bush, Brighton C. (2003), Defeat in Detail: The Ottoman Army in the Balkans, 1912-1913, Greenwood Publishing Group, ISBN 0-275-97888-5
- Hall, Richard C. (2000), The Balkan Wars, 1912-1913: Prelude to the First World War, Routledge, ISBN 0-415-22946-4
- Schurman, Jacob Gould (2004), The Balkan Wars 1912 To 1913, Kessinger Publishing, ISBN 1-4191-5345-5
- Chantepleure, Guy (Jeanne-Caroline Violet-Dussap) (1913), La ville assiégée : Janina. Octobre 1912-mars 1913. (in French), Calmann-Lévy

=== Articles ===
- Kaldis, William Peter (June 1979), "Background for Conflict: Greece, Turkey, and the Aegean Islands, 1912-1914", The Journal of Modern History, 51 (2, Supplement): D1119–D1146, doi:10.1086/242039, S2CID 144142861
- Michalopoulos, Dimitris (2005), Attitudes parallèles : Éleuthérios Vénisélos et Take Ionescu dans la Grande Guerre (in French), Institut de recherches sur Éleutherios Vénisélos et son époque, ISBN 960-88457-3-4
- Schneider, Raphaël (June–July 2008), "Les guerres balkaniques (1912-1913)", Champs de Bataille (in French), no. 22
