= Oratory (worship) =

Place set aside for prayer in Catholicism

An oratory in Andalgala department, Argentina.

In the canon law of the Catholic Church, an oratory is a place which is set aside by permission of an ordinary for divine worship, for the convenience of some community or group of the faithful who assemble there, but to which other members of the faithful may have access with the consent of the competent superior. The word oratory comes from the Latin verb orare, to pray.

== History ==
Oratories seem to have been developed in chapels built at the shrines of martyrs, for the faithful to assemble and pray on the spot. The oldest extant oratory is the Archiepiscopal Chapel in Ravenna (c. 500). The term is often used for very small structures surviving from the first millennium, especially in areas where the monasticism of Celtic Christianity was dominant; in these cases it may represent an archaeological guess as to function, in the absence of better evidence.

=== Public, semi-public, private ===
Previously, canon law distinguished several types of oratories: private (with use restricted to an individual, such as a bishop, or group, such as a family, and their invited guests); semi-public (open under certain circumstances to the public); or public (built for the benefit of any of the faithful who wish to use it). (1917 Code of Canon Law, canon 1223). The term is used for instance in the Rule of St Benedict (chapter 52) for the private communal chapel inside monasteries.

== Sacramental law usage ==
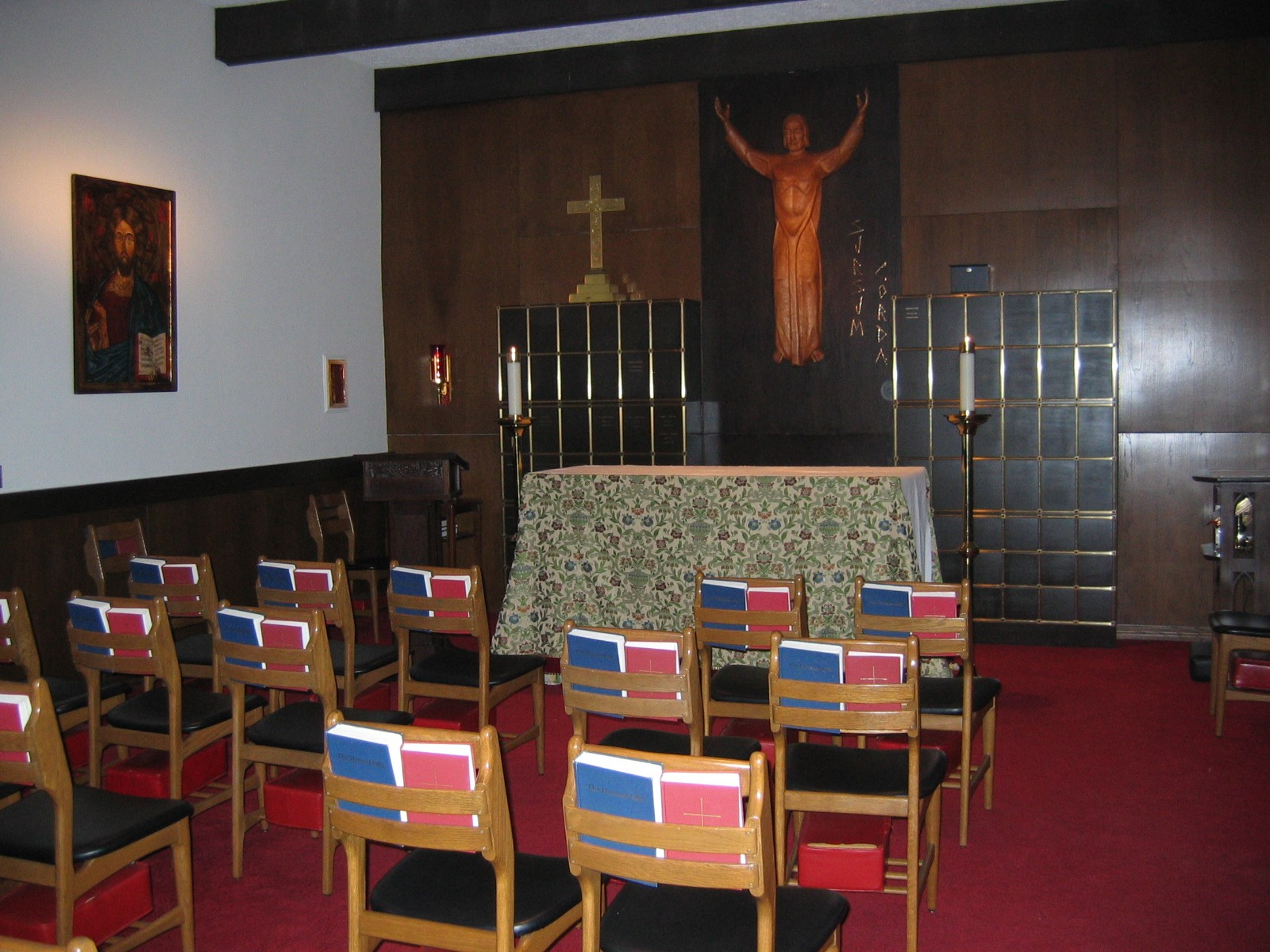
The oratory of the Cathedral Church of Saint Matthew, Dallas, Texas

In the sacramental law of sacred places, an oratory is a structure other than a parish church, set aside by ecclesiastical authority for prayer and the celebration of Mass. It is for all intents and purposes another word for what is commonly called a chapel, except that a few oratories are set up for the Divine Office and prayers but not Mass.

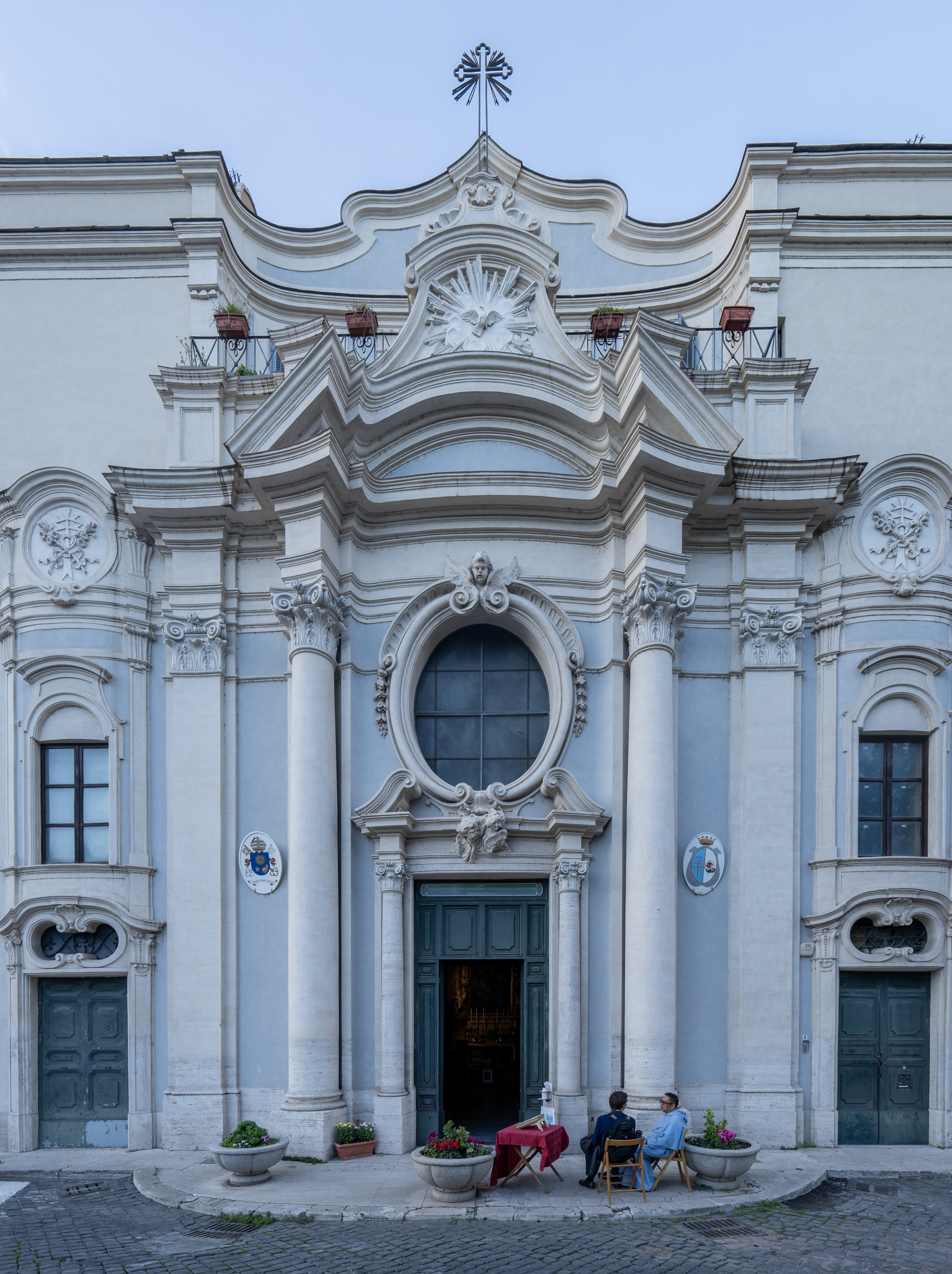
Oratory of Santa Maria Annunziata in Borgo, Rome

The distinctions between public, semi-public, and private have been eliminated in the 1983 Code of Canon Law in favour of new terminology. Oratory now means a private place of worship for a group or community which could be opened to the public at the discretion of the group's superior. This definition corresponds with the semi-public oratory of the 1917 Code of Canon Law. The private oratory of the 1917 Code corresponds very closely with the 1983 Code's chapel, as they are both places of worship for specific individuals.

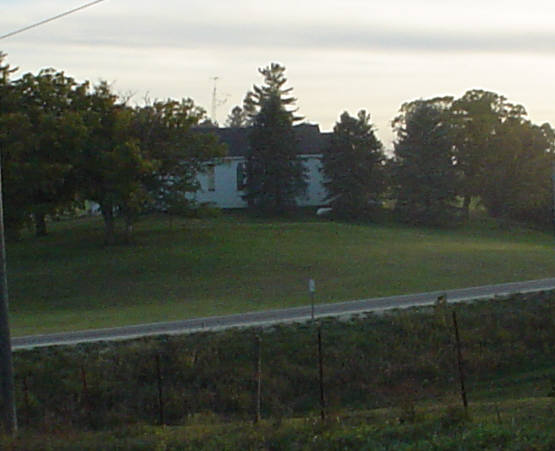
The former Saint Joseph's Prairie Church in Washington Township, Dubuque County, Iowa. The parish ceased being active in 1989, and the parish church was maintained as an oratory until it was deconsecrated and sold in 1994.

A parish church building may be transferred from the juridic person of a suppressed parish to another parish so that divine worship may continue there under the pastoral ministry of another parish. In some cases, when the parish has been closed, the church building and grounds become the responsibility of a neighbouring parish, because the church building as such is legally distinct from the juridic personality of the parish, and so can be transferred to another juridic person. It usually would not have regular liturgies scheduled, but the oratory can be made available for special liturgical functions, including weddings, funerals, holidays, holy days of obligation, the feast day of the church's patron Saint, and other liturgical celebrations. Recently many churches have been revitalized as oratories for the Roman Mass in the United Kingdom and in the United States, institutions such as the Institute of Christ the King Sovereign Priest have done extensive restoration jobs in those temples.

== Oratorians ==
The term can also refer to the local house of the Oratorians, the congregation of priests founded by Philip Neri in Rome, Italy, in 1575.

== Examples ==
- Oratory of the Holy Face in Tours, France
- Oratory of Saint Cénéré in Saulges, France
- Gallarus Oratory in County Kerry, Ireland
- St. Mochta's House in County Louth, Ireland
- St. Columb's House in County Meath, Ireland
- St. Manchan's Oratory in County Kerry, Ireland
- Llandaff Oratory in South Africa
- The Oratory of Our Lady & St. Francis of Assisi in Warndon Villages, Worcester, England
- Saint Joseph's Oratory is the name of a Roman Catholic basilica in Montreal
- Fifteen different oratories inside of the Basilica of the National Shrine of the Immaculate Conception in Washington, D.C.
- St. Francis de Sales Oratory (St. Louis) is a designated oratory in the Roman Catholic Archdiocese of St. Louis in the care of the Institute of Christ the King Sovereign Priest
- Oratorio de San Felipe de Neri in Toledo, Castile-La Mancha, Spain
- Oratory of San Francesco Saverio del Caravita in Rome, Italy
- Oratory of Rosario di San Domenico in Palermo, Sicily, Italy
- London Oratory
