= Serenicus =

7th-century Italian Benedictine monk

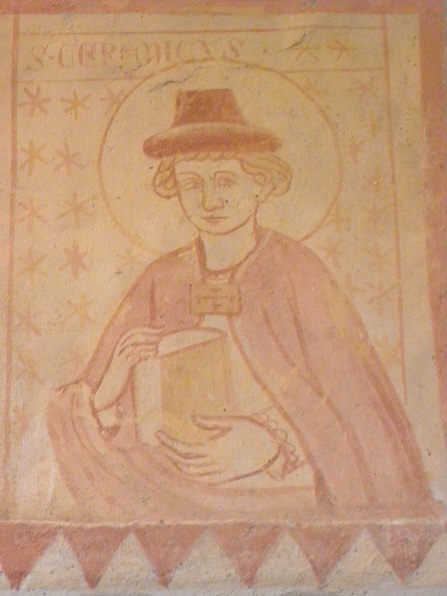
- Saint Serenicus shown in the Church of Saint-Céneri-le-Gére
- Born: c. 620; Spoleto, Italy
- Died: c. 669 (aged approx. 48–49); Saint-Céneri-le-Gérei, France
- Feast: May 7

Saint Serenicus (French: Céneri or Sérène; c. 620 – c. 669) was an Italian Benedictine monk. He was an early evangelist in Normandy, and founded a monastery and a chapel in a village in Orne that later took the name of Saint-Céneri-le-Gérei.

Serenicus is venerated as a saint. His feast day is celebrated on May 7 with his brother Serenidus of Saulges, or locally on August 16. He is a patron against skin diseases, colic, and infertility.

== Background ==
Born into a noble family in Umbria around 620, Serenicus travelled to the province of Maine in 649 during the reign of the Merovingian king Clovis II with his brother, Serenidus, to live a life of contemplation and penance. At first, he lived with Serenidus as a hermit and an ascetic near Saulges in the diocese of Le Mans.

At some point, Serenicus departed Saulges and began to live near a village in Orne near the Sarthe river. He started accepting disciples and found a church dedicated to Martin of Tours and an accompanying monastery. He ended up accepting a few disciples and built a church dedicated to Saint Martin of Tours and a monastic establishment. The church was completed by Bishop, and saint, Milehard de Sées.

It is said that after a long journey Serenicus settled in Orne, where he experienced a miracle in answer to his prayer for water to quench his thirst. According to legend a spring, located near the banks of the Sarthe, sprang up in answer to his prayer. It is believed that the water from the spring has the ability to cure eye problems.

Serenicus is thought to have died around 669.

== See also ==
- Church of Saint-Cénéry de Parigné-sur-Braye
- Church of Saint-Céneri-le-Gerei
