= Honoratus a Sancta Maria =

Honoratus a Sancta Maria (1651–1729) was a French Discalced Carmelite, known as a prolific controversialist. His secular name was Blaise Vauxelles (or Vauxelle, Vauzelle), and he was known also by the French version of his name in religion, Honoré de Sainte-Marie.

== Life ==
He was born at Limoges, 4 July 1651. Blaise Vauxelles took his vows as Honaratus at Toulouse, 8 March 1671. On completing his course of studies he decided on the missionary life, and was accordingly sent to Malta to prepare for the East. But the superiors detained him there as a sub-prior, and at the expiration of his term of office he returned to France without having been to the missions. He successively filled the posts of professor of philosophy and theology, prior, provincial, and visitor general. He died at Lille, 1729.

== Works ==
He dealt with the burning religious questions of his time: Quietism, Jansenism, Gallicanism; but also with Cartesianism in philosophy, and rationalism in the relationship of scripture and history. During his life he was accused of not always applying the rules of criticism he himself had established.

His works may be divided into various classes.

=== Philosophical ===
- Disputationes philosophicæ (Clermont, 1686) against Descartes and Gassendi

=== Theological ===
- Propositiones theologicæ (Perpignan, 1689), an exposition of the Apostles' Creed from the dogmatic, scholastic, and historical point of view
- Dissertations on Grace and Predestination, unpublished
- A Treatise on Indulgences and the Jubilee (Bordeaux, 1701), reprinted at Clermont and in Belgium in preparation for the Jubilee of 1725
- Dissertation apologétique (Bordeaux, 1701), in defence of the Examen de la théologie mystique of Jean Chéron, Calced Carmelite (1596–1673), which had been attacked by a Franciscan
- On Contemplation (Paris, 1708) from the dogmatic and practical point of view, a defence of the Carmelite tradition of mysticism, giving a complete chain of utterances of the Church Fathers and ecclesiastical writers, in two volumes. This work was translated into Italian and Spanish; a continuation of it appeared in 1713 under the title The Motives and Practice of Divine Love.
- A Problem addressed to the Learned (Paris, 1708), an examination and rejection of the claims of Denis the Areopagite to the authorship of the works commonly attributed to him

=== Polemical ===
His polemical works are largely directed against Jansenism:

- four volumes in defence of the Constitution Unigenitus (anonymous); the first two appeared in 1710, the others in 1722
- Notes on the writings of Jansenius, Saint-Cyran, Arnauld, Quesnel, Petitpied and others (Ypres, 1724)
- Reply to the Examen théologique by a Jansenist (anonymous, 1723)
- Defence of the Encyclical of Benedict XIII of 1 Oct. 1724, on the teaching of Augustine of Hippo and Thomas Aquinas (Brussels, 1725)
- a letter arguing that a certain miracle said to have happened at the Corpus Christi procession in Paris (31 May 1725) had not been wrought in favour of those who refused to sign the bull Unigenitus
- a letter addressed to a certain abbé on the necessity of subscribing to the bull Unigenitus
- a collection of dissertations on the same Constitution (Brussels, 1727).

=== Historical and critical ===
- Theologiæ positiones (Toulouse, 1706), containing a solution of chronological and other difficulties to be met with in the Bible, a prelude to the author's major work on criticism
- Historical and critical dissertations on the orders of knighthood (Paris, 1718, also in Italian, Brescia, 1761)
- the Life of St. John of the Cross (Tournai, 1727), written on the occasion of the canonization of the saint
- a critical edition of a manuscript of Flodoardus, with notes and dissertations, which, however, the author did not live to carry through the press
- Réflexions sur les règles et l'usage de la critique, three volumes (Paris, 1712, 1717, and Lyons, 1720). This work has been several times reprinted, appeared also in Latin, Italian, and Spanish, and is the one by which Honoratus is best known;
- Denuntiatio historiæ ecclesiasticæ (anonymous, 1726). While the Réflexions were chiefly directed against Tillemont, this work takes Fleury to task for his Gallicanism
- A treatise on the so-called Mass of Flacius Illyricus, of which Honoratus had already spoken in the Réflexions, unpublished.
