= Élie Sauvage =

French playwright and novelist

Élis Sauvage
- Born: 13 May 1814; Mayenne, France
- Died: 30 December 1871 (aged 57); Paris, France
- Occupations: Playwright, novelist

Élie Sauvage (13 May 1814 – 30 December 1871), full name Élie François Victor Sauvage, was a 19th-century French playwright and novelist.

He was the son of Angélique-Renée Rotureau and René Sauvage, a trader in Mayenne. He collaborated to the newspaper La Mayenne and began his literary career with a volume of verse. He then turned to the theater and produced alone or in collaboration, a dozen plays. A member of the Société des gens de lettres, towards the end of his life he published two novels, Mirette, a spiritist one, and La Petite Bohémienne which was translated into English as The Little Gipsy.

== Publications ==
Theatre

- 1833: Un matelot, vaudeville in 1 act, with Gabriel de Lurieu, Paris, Théâtre du Palais-Royal, 6 March
- 1836: Julien l'évangéliste, drama in 5 acts and in verse
- 1845: Jeanne d'Arc en prison, monologue in 1 act and in verse, with René Périn, Théâtre du Luxembourg
- 1844: Le Roi Lear, drama in 4 acts and in verse, imites from Shakspeare, with Frédéric Duhomme, Paris, Théâtre de l'Odéon, 10 November
- 1845: La Tour de Ferrare, drama in 5 acts and 6 tableaux, with Jules-Édouard Alboize de Pujol and Charles Lafont, Paris, Théâtre de la Gaîté, 30 April
- 1846: Le Comte Julien, ou le Château maudit, drama in 4 acts, with Frédéric Duhomme, Paris, Théâtre de la Porte-Saint-Martin, 31 January
- 1846: La Vestale, tragedy in 5 acts, in verse, with Frédéric Duhomme, Paris, Théâtre-Français, 30 May
- 1851: Boudjali, comédie-vaudeville in 1 act, with Frédéric Duhomme and René Chevalier, Paris, Théâtre des Folies-Dramatiques, 4 November
- 1852: Un mari brûlé, comedy in 1 act mingled with song, with Eugène Nus, Paris, Théâtre des Folies-Dramatiques, 8 September
- 1854: La Servante du roi, drama in 5 acts and in verse, with Frédéric Duhomme, Paris, Théâtre de l'Odéon, 24 April
- 1856: Le Nord et le Midi, comedy in 1 act, in prose, Paris, Théâtre de l'Odéon, 7 December
- 1861: Les Mores de Grenade, drama in 3 acts and in verse, précédé d'un prologue
- 1864: Les Coiffeurs, comédie-vaudeville in 3 acts, Paris, Théâtre des Variétés, 7 May

Novels

- 1867: Mirette, spirit novel
- 1868: La Petite Bohémienne

Poetry

- 1835: Les Rayons du matin
