= Mayenne (commune) =

- Subprefecture and commune
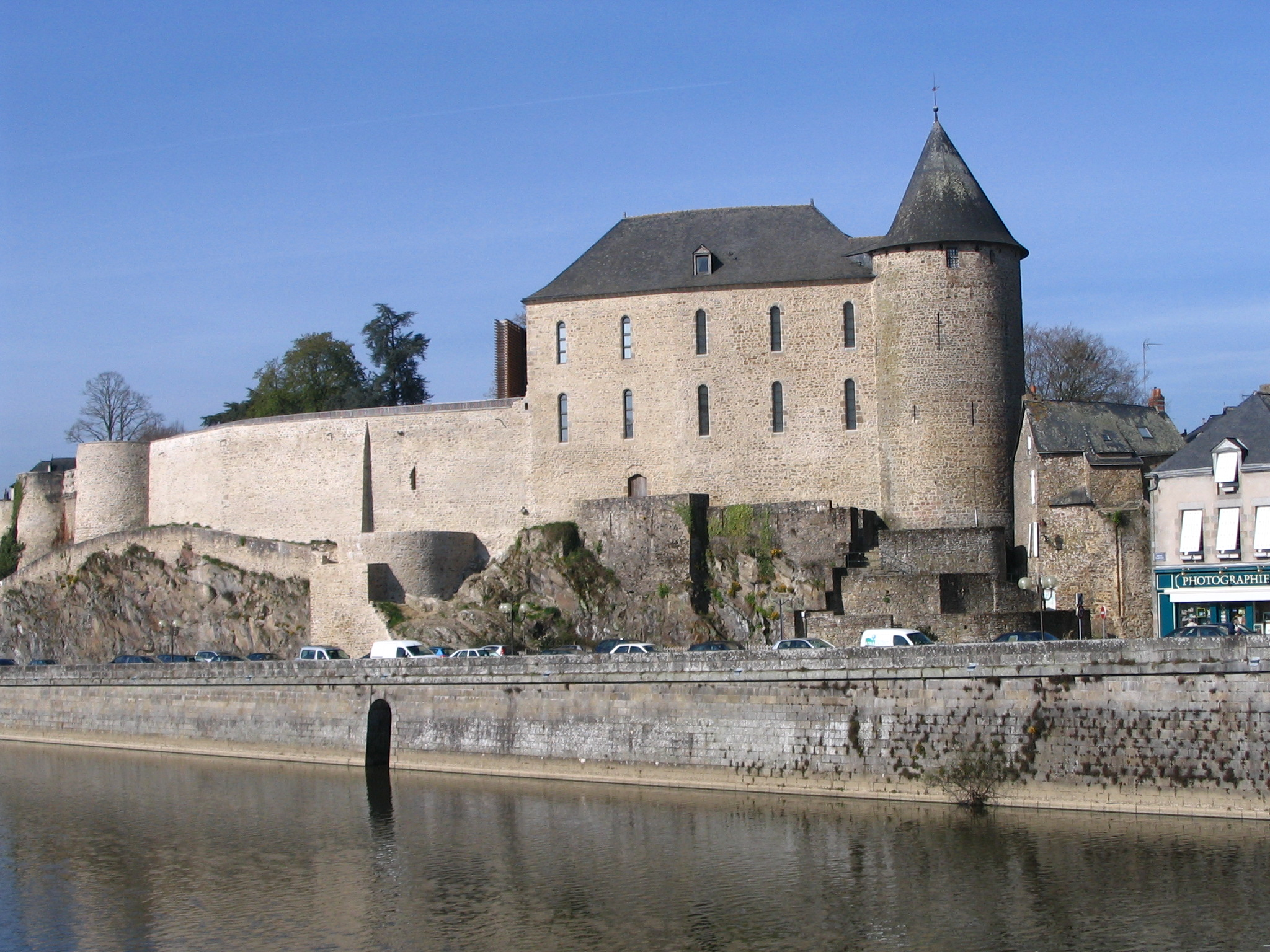
- The Château de Mayenne, and the Mayenne river

- Coat of arms
- Location of Mayenne
- Location within France Location within Pays de la Loire
- Coordinates: 48°18′43″N 0°37′06″W
- Country: France
- Region: Pays de la Loire
- Department: Mayenne
- Arrondissement: Mayenne
- Canton: Mayenne

Government
  - Mayor (2020–2026): Jean-Pierre Le Scornet
- Area^{1}: 19.88 km^{2} (7.68 sq mi)
- Elevation: 124 m (407 ft)
- Highest elevation: 159 m (522 ft)
- Lowest elevation: 82 m (269 ft)
- Population (2023): 12,883
  - Density: 648.0/km^{2} (1,678/sq mi)
- Time zone: UTC+01:00 (CET)
  - Summer (DST): UTC+02:00 (CEST)
- INSEE/Postal code: 53147 /53100
- ^{1} French Land Register data, which excludes lakes, ponds, glaciers > 1 km^{2} (0.386 sq mi or 247 acres) and river estuaries.

Mayenne (/maɪˈɛn/, French: [majɛn]) is a commune in the Mayenne department, northwestern France. It is a subprefecture of the department. It is situated on the river Mayenne.

== History ==
In medieval times, the town was the seat of the Lords of Mayenne. The town originated when Juhel II of Mayenne (lord of Mayenne, Gorron and Ambrières (1110–1161)) built a monastery near the gate of the pre-existing castle, which led to the formation of the settlement.

Mayenne was besieged twice during the French Wars of Religion, in 1574 and 1590, and suffered substantial damage. It was rebuilt and re-embellished in the following century thanks to the help of Cardinal Mazarin. It however suffered from plague in 1707.

On 9 June 1944, during World War II, it was bombed by the RAF, which caused heavy damage and numerous casualties.

== Population ==
Historical population
Year	Pop.	±% p.a.
1968	11,395	—
1975	12,450	+1.27%
1982	13,333	+0.98%
1990	13,549	+0.20%
1999	13,724	+0.14%
2007	13,555	−0.15%
2012	13,257	−0.44%
2017	12,841	−0.64%
2023	12,883	+0.05%
Source: INSEE

== Main sights ==
- The Château, built in the 10th century (900–920) is an exceptional example of a palace dating from the Carolingian period. Reception room, tower and cellar are remarkably well preserved. The dungeon and ramparts, built in the 13th century to transform the castle into a fortress, still proudly dominate the river and the town of Mayenne. The vaulted rooms and the chapel still have thirteenth century decorations. The chapel dating from the 19th century with its baroque decoration bears witness to the long period of time he was a prison. Once used as a prison, since 2008 it is home to the "Musée du Château de Mayenne" (the Mayenne Castle Museum).
- The Basilica of Notre-Dame, founded in 1100. Of the original building, only the piers and the arcades of the nave remain.
- Romanesque church of St. Martin, enlarged in neo-medieval style during the nineteenth century.

== Notable people ==
- Guy Chantepleure, writer
- Paul Delaunay, physician and historian
- Elias Durand, pharmacist and botanist
- Étiemble, writer
- Marc Joulaud, politician
- Édouard Lambert, sports shooter
- Jean-François Rivière, footballer
- Romain Salin, footballer
- Michel Tronchay, priest and historian
- Élie Sauvage (1814–1871), playwright

== Twin towns – sister cities ==
Mayenne is twinned with:

- Devizes, England, United Kingdom
- Jesi, Italy
- Waiblingen, Germany

== Climate ==
Climate data for Mayenne (1991–2020 normals, extremes 1948–present)
Month	Jan	Feb	Mar	Apr	May	Jun	Jul	Aug	Sep	Oct	Nov	Dec	Year
Record high °C (°F)	16.0 (60.8)	21.5 (70.7)	24.0 (75.2)	29.3 (84.7)	31.1 (88.0)	38.1 (100.6)	39.5 (103.1)	37.8 (100.0)	34.0 (93.2)	29.0 (84.2)	22.0 (71.6)	16.5 (61.7)	39.5 (103.1)
Mean daily maximum °C (°F)	8.1 (46.6)	9.3 (48.7)	12.6 (54.7)	15.7 (60.3)	19.0 (66.2)	22.3 (72.1)	24.4 (75.9)	24.4 (75.9)	21.2 (70.2)	16.5 (61.7)	11.6 (52.9)	8.5 (47.3)	16.1 (61.0)
Daily mean °C (°F)	5.2 (41.4)	5.7 (42.3)	8.1 (46.6)	10.5 (50.9)	13.9 (57.0)	17.0 (62.6)	18.9 (66.0)	18.9 (66.0)	15.9 (60.6)	12.5 (54.5)	8.3 (46.9)	5.6 (42.1)	11.7 (53.1)
Mean daily minimum °C (°F)	2.3 (36.1)	2.0 (35.6)	3.7 (38.7)	5.4 (41.7)	8.8 (47.8)	11.7 (53.1)	13.4 (56.1)	13.4 (56.1)	10.7 (51.3)	8.5 (47.3)	5.0 (41.0)	2.6 (36.7)	7.3 (45.1)
Record low °C (°F)	−15.0 (5.0)	−12.0 (10.4)	−8.0 (17.6)	−4.0 (24.8)	−2.0 (28.4)	1.5 (34.7)	3.0 (37.4)	2.9 (37.2)	0.0 (32.0)	−4.0 (24.8)	−4.5 (23.9)	−14.0 (6.8)	−15.0 (5.0)
Average precipitation mm (inches)	86.9 (3.42)	70.5 (2.78)	62.5 (2.46)	56.6 (2.23)	67.9 (2.67)	54.7 (2.15)	57.8 (2.28)	56.1 (2.21)	64.9 (2.56)	86.1 (3.39)	87.5 (3.44)	98.4 (3.87)	849.9 (33.46)
Average precipitation days (≥ 1.0 mm)	14.3	11.5	10.6	10.4	10.1	8.4	8.2	8.5	9.1	11.8	13.2	14.8	130.9
Source: Meteociel

== See also ==
- Communes of Mayenne
- Jublains archeological site
