= Saint-Céneri-le-Gérei =

- Commune
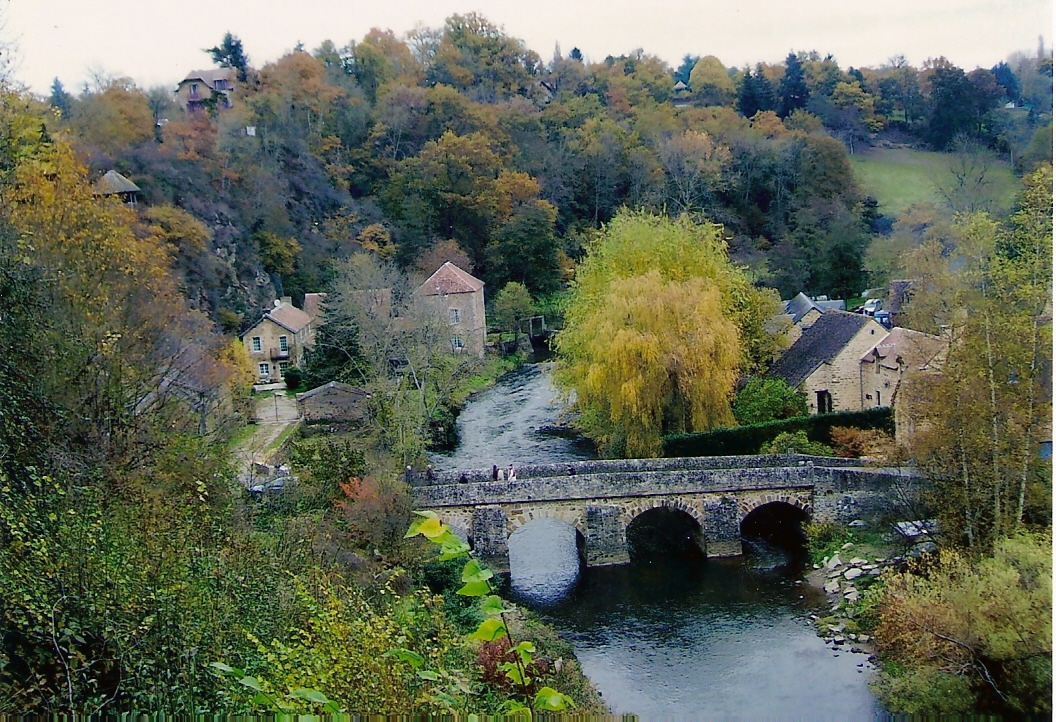
- Bridge over the River Sarthe
- Location of Saint-Céneri-le-Gérei
- Location within France Location within Normandy
- Coordinates: 48°22′51″N 0°03′05″W
- Country: France
- Region: Normandy
- Department: Orne
- Arrondissement: Alençon
- Canton: Damigny
- Intercommunality: CU Alençon

Government
  - Mayor (2020–2026): Richard Marquet
- Area^{1}: 3.86 km^{2} (1.49 sq mi)
- Elevation: 120 m (390 ft)
- Highest elevation: 193 m (633 ft)
- Lowest elevation: 115 m (377 ft)
- Population (2023): 110
  - Density: 28/km^{2} (74/sq mi)
- Time zone: UTC+01:00 (CET)
  - Summer (DST): UTC+02:00 (CEST)
- INSEE/Postal code: 61372 /61250
- ^{1} French Land Register data, which excludes lakes, ponds, glaciers > 1 km^{2} (0.386 sq mi or 247 acres) and river estuaries.

Saint-Céneri-le-Gérei (French pronunciation: [sɛ̃ sen(ə)ʁi lə ʒeʁɛ]) is a commune in the Orne department in north-western France.

It lies on the river Sarthe 13 km (8.1 mi) from Alençon, the chef-lieu of the department, and some 200 km (120 mi) west of Paris. It is classed as a Petites Cités de Caractère.

== History ==
The place is named for Serenicus (or Genericus), an Italian hermit who lived here during the 7th century. Known today as Saint Céneri, the Italian monk is reputed to have settled here after a long journey, when he experienced a miracle in answer to his prayer for water to quench his thirst. According to legend the so-called miraculous spring, located near the banks of the River Sarthe and today covered by a small stone shelter topped with a cross, sprang up in answer to his prayer. It came to be believed that water from the spring had the ability to cure eye problems.

When he died, a monastery was built, later destroyed by the Vikings in 903. The church was a dependency of the abbey of Saint-Evroult-en-Ouche.

The name le-Gérei comes from William Giroie, who built a castle here in 1044 of which only parts of the walls remain today. In 1060 the castle came under siege from Duke William II of Normandy (the future King William I of England) before being taken by Robert Curthose his son in 1088.

During the Hundred Years' War, Ambroise de Loré managed to defend the stronghold against the king of England Henry V and, then his brother John Plantagenet until 1434.

The beauty of the village's setting, in a wooded loop of the River Sarthe, has attracted and inspired many artists since the 19th century. Among the renowned painters who have been drawn to the village's beauty are Jean-Baptiste-Camille Corot, Gustave Courbet and Henri Harpignies. The popularity of the village was evidenced by the establishment of the Auberge des Sœurs Moisy, a hotel run by the Moisy sisters as an artists' retreat in the latter years of the 19th century. Today the inn on Rue de Dessous, which attracted Impressionist Painters for half a century between 1875 and 1908, is an art museum, the Auberge Des Souers Moisy Museum. The museum's most original feature is its celebrated Salle des Décapités, or Room of the Beheaded, which is decorated with an array of black, silhouetted heads drawn in profile.

Pierre Renard, son of artist Mary Renard, recalled the process by which the profiles of artists of the time were created: "At nightfall, the one whose profile we wanted to reproduce would stand next to the whitewashed wall; one of us held a candle at a distance so that the shadow cast was the size of the model. One of the painters, meanwhile, traced the outline of this shadow in charcoal, and the interior was painted in black. This is how, since then, I have been able to recognize, beyond the half-century which has unfortunately elapsed, the profiles of many artists and friends who are no longer. My child profile is there twice."

The village even has its own festival which annually celebrates those painters who came to, or lived in, Saint-Céneri-le-Gérei.

== Geography ==
Saint-Céneri-le-Gérei is situated in the Orne department of the region of Normandy, and is located in the Mancelles Alps in the heart of the Normandy-Maine Regional Nature Park. Saint-Céneri-le-Gérei shares three other Natura 2000 conservation sites with neighbouring communes, the Alpes Mancelles, the Haute vallée de la Sarthe and the Vallée du Sarthon et affluents.

The Sarthe river flows through the commune.

The commune is in the Normandie-Maine Regional Natural Park.

The boundary of Normandy and the neighbouring region of Pays de la Loire is marked by a large metal screw affixed in the stone railing of Saint-Céneri-le-Gérei's historic stone bridge spanning the Sarthe River. The area attracts nature enthusiasts and outdoor adventurers to its wooded hills, rocky cliffs, steep river valleys and patchwork of farmland meadows defined by hedgerows. Visitors are attracted to the nature park's beauty and also to activities such as hiking, horse riding, mountain biking, canoeing and kayaking, and fishing. Visitors can climb to the summit of Mont de Avaloirs, which is the highest point in the region and commands far-reaching views despite being only 416 metres high. Saint-Céneri-le-Gérei is also the starting point for a 10-kilometre walk that is outlined in information available at the village's tourist office.

The commune is made up of the following collection of villages and hamlets, Les Mézazelières, Le Gué de Moulins and Saint-Céneri-le-Gérei.

== Architecture ==
The scenic village has many old stone houses along its winding lanes, and a four-arched historic stone bridge spans the River Sarthe. An 11th-century Romanesque church is perched high above the river and contains large frescoes. The frescoes were painted in the 12th and 14th century, but were plastered over in the 17th century. This is believed to have contributed to their preservation, because they were hidden for about 200 years before they were rediscovered.

A 15th-century medieval stone chapel whose original wooden incarnation is believed to have been built by Saint Céneri stands alone in a sprawling meadow near the Sarthe. Inside the chapel is a statue of Saint-Céneri to which various miracles have been attributed.

== Economy ==
Saint-Céneri's economy is largely based on tourism, its status as one of Les Plus Beaux Villages de France ("France's Most Beautiful Villages") attracting many visitors to the village.

== Notable buildings and places ==
Jardins de la Mansonière is a garden that is open to the public.

=== National heritage sites ===
The Commune has four buildings and areas listed as a Monument historique

- Saint-Céneri Chapel a fifteenth century chapel in Saint-Céneri-le-Gérei.
- The former Moisy Inn an eighteenth century former inn in Saint-Céneri-le-Gérei, that attracted several artists including Mary Renard and Paul Saïn.
- Church of Saint-Céneri-le-Gerei an eleventh century church Saint-Céneri-le-Gérei.
- The former Legangeux hotel a nineteenth century former hotel in Saint-Céneri-le-Gérei, that features several paintings by visiting artists, such as Mary Renard. The former hotel is now a museum.

== Transport ==
Saint-Céneri lies within 10 to 15 km (9.3 mi) of both the A28 motorway – linking Abbeville to Tours by way of Rouen and Le Mans – and the N12 trunk road from Paris to Rennes and Brest.

== See also ==
- Communes of the Orne department
- Parc naturel régional Normandie-Maine
