= Louis-Sébastien Le Nain de Tillemont =

French ecclesiastical historian (1637–1698)

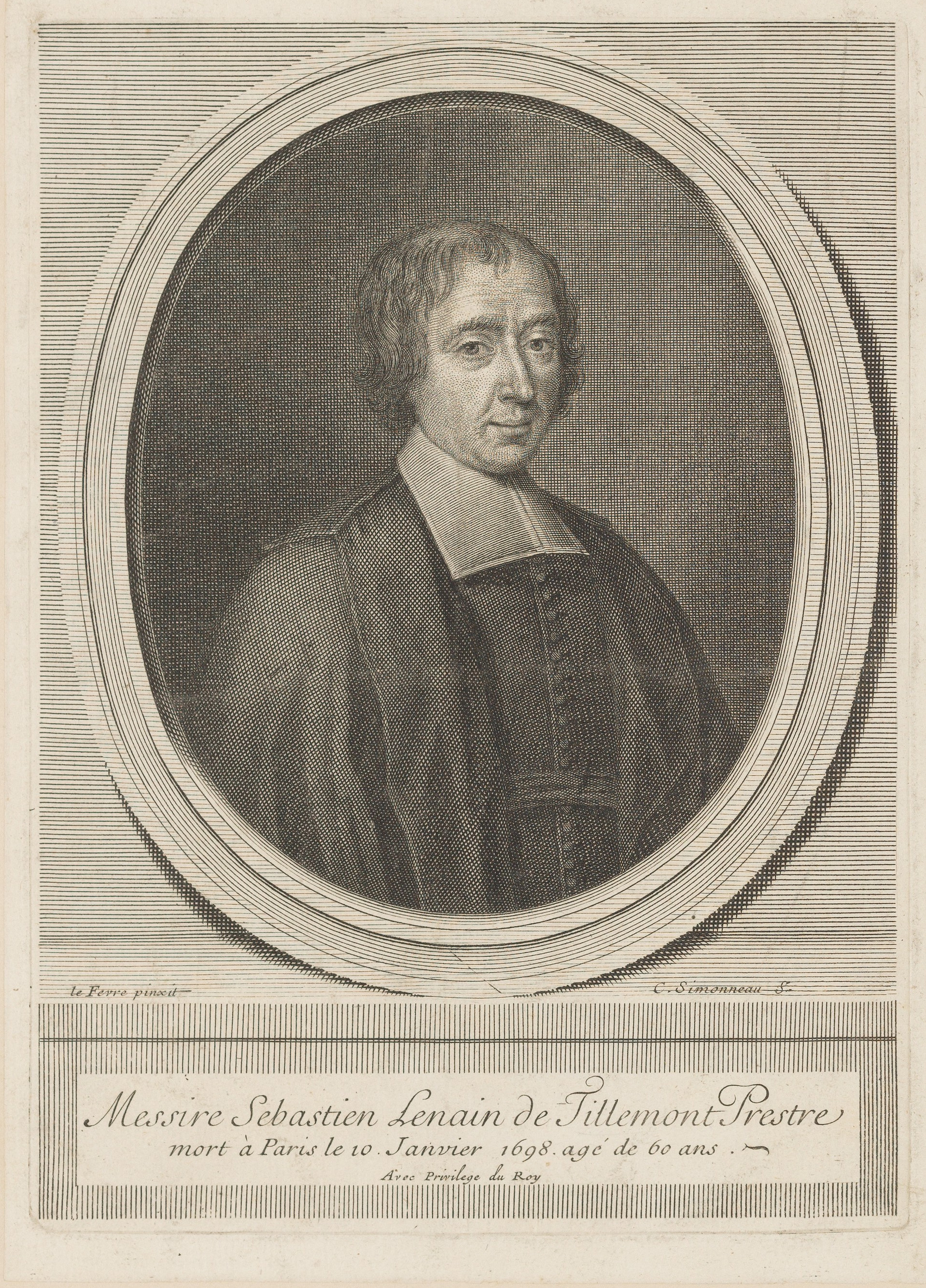
- de Tillemont based on portrait by Claude Lefebvre
- Born: 30 November 1637
- Died: 10 January 1698 (aged 60)
- Education: Petites écoles of Port-Royal
- Occupations: Cleric and historian

Louis-Sébastien Le Nain de Tillemont (30 November 1637 – 10 January 1698) was a French ecclesiastical historian.

== Life ==
He was born in Paris into a wealthy Jansenist family and was educated at the Petites écoles of Port-Royal, where his historical interests were formed and encouraged. At the age of twenty, he began his two monumental works, the Mémoires pour servir à l'histoire ecclésiastique des six premiers siècles and the Histoire des empereurs et autres princes qui ont régné pendant les six premiers siècles de l'Église. The first is a history of the first six centuries of the Christian Church. The second is a history of the Roman emperors during the same period.

Tillemont became a priest at the age of 39 and settled at Port-Royal. When Port-Royal was dissolved in 1679, he moved to his family estate at Tillemont, where he spent the rest of his life, pursuing his historical work with great devotion. His Histoire began to issue from the press in 1690 and his Mémoires in 1693. The publication of both works was not complete at the time of his death. The final volumes were completed and published posthumously by his secretary Michel Tronchay. Tronchay also published a biography of Tillemont in 1706 titled Idee de la vie et de l'esprit de M. L. de Tillemont.

Tillemont is cited frequently by Edward Gibbon in his Decline and Fall of the Roman Empire.

Tillemont's works were among the first to provide critical surveys of the full range of source material. His prose style is considered dry, but he had a reputation for accuracy, detail and conscientiousness. His work was attacked on a large scale by Honoratus a Sancta Maria in his three-volume Réflexions sur les règles et l'usage de la critique (1712–1720).

== Selected works ==
- Histoire des empereurs et des autres princes qui ont régné durant les six premiers siècles de l'Église (6 vol.), 1690–1697, 1701, 1738.
- Mémoires pour servir à l'histoire ecclésiastique des six premiers siècles, justifiés par les citations des auteurs originaux avec une chronologie où l'on fait un abrégé de l'histoire ecclésiastique et avec des notes pour éclaircir les difficultés des faits et de la chronologie (16 vol.), 1693–1712.
- Vie de saint Louis roi de France (6 vol.), editor Jules Renouard, Paris, 1847–1851.
- Calendrier des fêtes des saints illustres, 1919.
