= Church of Saint-Céneri-le-Gerei =

Church in Saint-Cénéri-le-Gérei, France

- Église Saint-Céneri de Saint-Céneri-le-Gérei
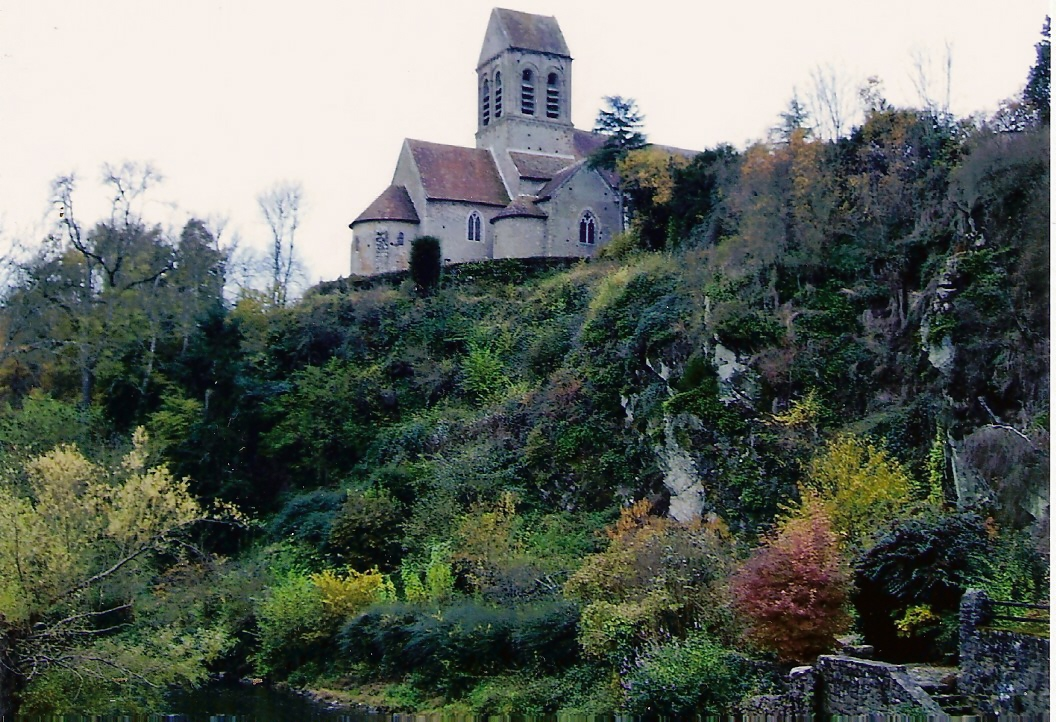
- The rear of the Church of Saint-Céneri-le-Gerei
- Church of Saint-Céneri-le-Gerei
- 48.3781°N 0.05194°W
- Location: Saint-Cénéri-le-Gérei
- Country: France
- Denomination: Catholic

The Church of Saint-Céneri-le-Gerei (French: Église Saint-Céneri-le-Gerei) is a Roman Catholic church named after Serenicus in the commune of Saint-Cénéri-le-Gérei in north-western France. It was built in the late-11th and early-12th centuries. It is a listed monument since 1886.

== Background ==
Construction on the church started in 1089 on a rocky cliff overlooking the Sarthe river on the site of an old church dedicated to Saint-Martin du Mont-Rocheux. It was completed in 1125. The old church had been destroyed by the Normans in the 10th century. The church is built in the Norman style, and contains the traditional nave and transept, with small chapels. It has a choir with a curved apse. The church was restored in 2006.
