= Michel Tronchay =

Michel Tronchay (October 1668 – 30 October 1733) was a French Catholic priest, writer, philosopher, and the secretary of French historian Louis-Sébastien Le Nain de Tillemont. After Tillemont's death, Tronchay completed and published volumes 6–16 of Mémoires pour servir à l'histoire ecclésiastique des six premiers siècles, a history of the first six centuries of the Christian church. He also completed and published the final volume 6 of Histoire des empereurs et autres princes qui ont régné pendant les six premiers siècles de l'Église, a history of the Roman Empire. That work was often cited by Edward Gibbon in his Decline and Fall of the Roman Empire.

Tronchay published a biography of Tillemont in 1706, Idee de la vie et de T esprit de M. L. de Tillemont, and a history of Port-Royal-des-Champs Abbey titled Histoire abrégée de l'abbaye de PortRoyal.

Tronchay was born in Mayenne in October 1668. He died on 30 October 1733.
