= Guy Chantepleure =

French writer (1870–1951)

Jeanne-Caroline Augusta Violet Dussap (1 February 1870 in Paris – 26 June 1951 in Mayenne) was a French writer who wrote under the pseudonym of Guy Chantepleure or Guy de Chantepleure. She is best remembered for her novel Ma conscience en robe rose (1895), which was awarded a Montyon Prize in 1896. She was married to Edgar Dussap, a diplomat who served as Consul General in the Ottoman Empire, Greece and Australia.
