= Saulges =

- Commune
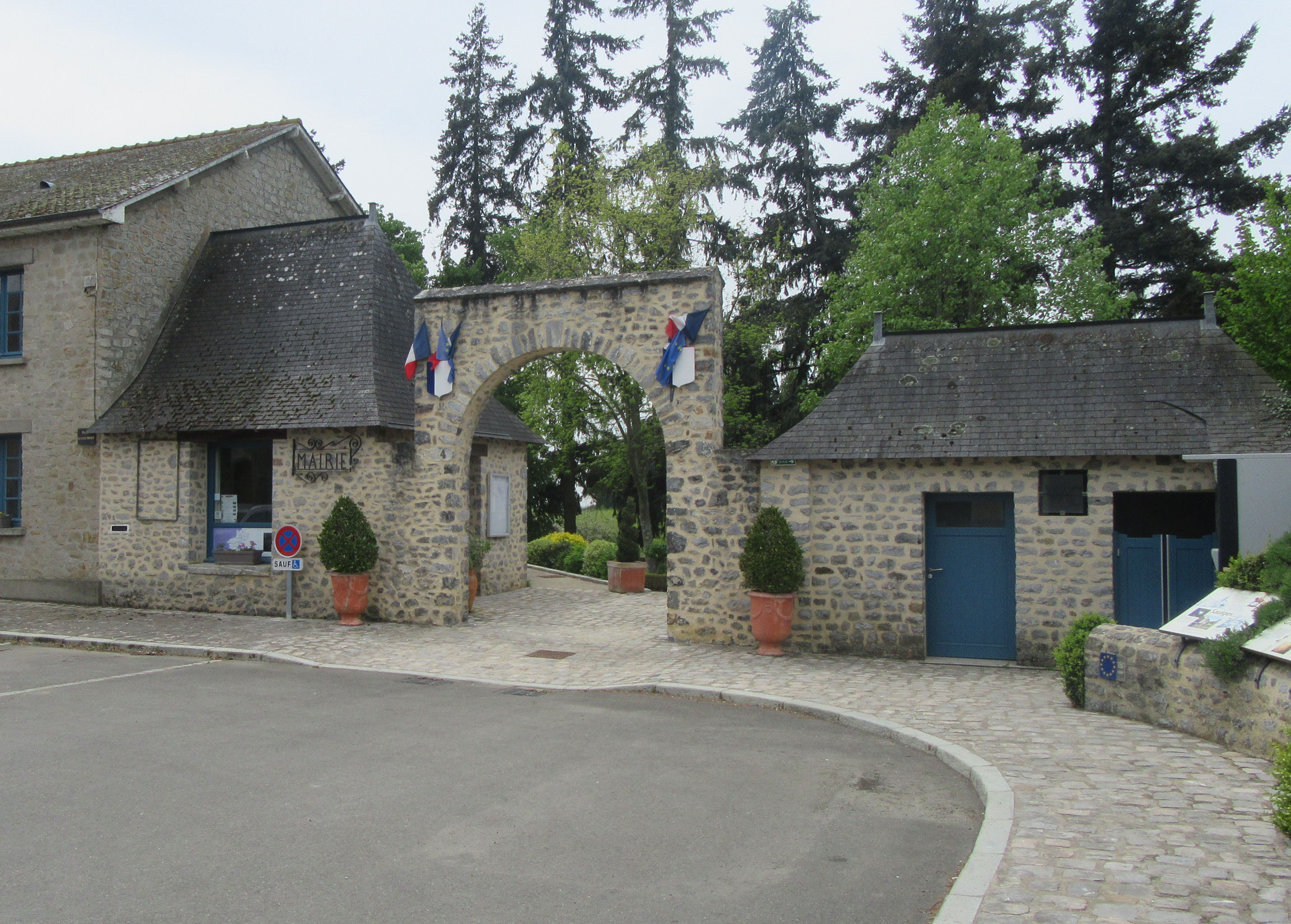
- Town Hall
- Location of Saulges
- Location within France Location within Pays de la Loire
- Coordinates: 47°59′00″N 0°24′16″W
- Country: France
- Region: Pays de la Loire
- Department: Mayenne
- Arrondissement: France#Mayenne
- Canton: Meslay-du-Maine

Government
  - Mayor (2020–2026): Jacqueline Lepage
- Area^{1}: 21.81 km^{2} (8.42 sq mi)
- Elevation: 100 m (330 ft)
- Highest elevation: 112 m (367 ft)
- Lowest elevation: 47 m (154 ft)
- Population (2023): 329
  - Density: 15.1/km^{2} (39.1/sq mi)
- Time zone: UTC+01:00 (CET)
  - Summer (DST): UTC+02:00 (CEST)
- INSEE/Postal code: 53257 /53340
- ^{1} French Land Register data, which excludes lakes, ponds, glaciers > 1 km^{2} (0.386 sq mi or 247 acres) and river estuaries.

Saulges (French pronunciation: [solʒ]) is a commune in the Mayenne department in north-western France.

== Gallery ==
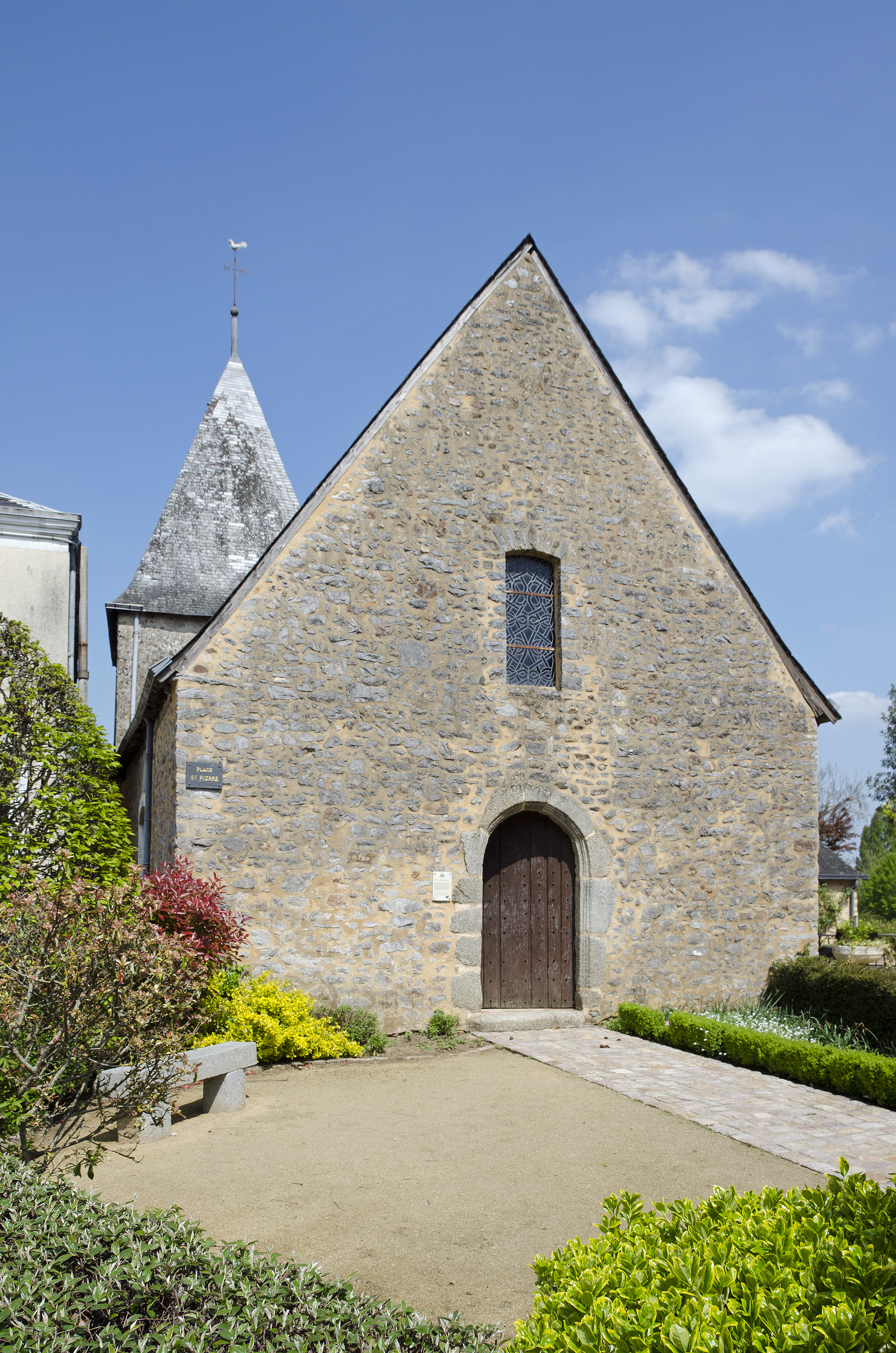
Saint Peter's Church in Saulges

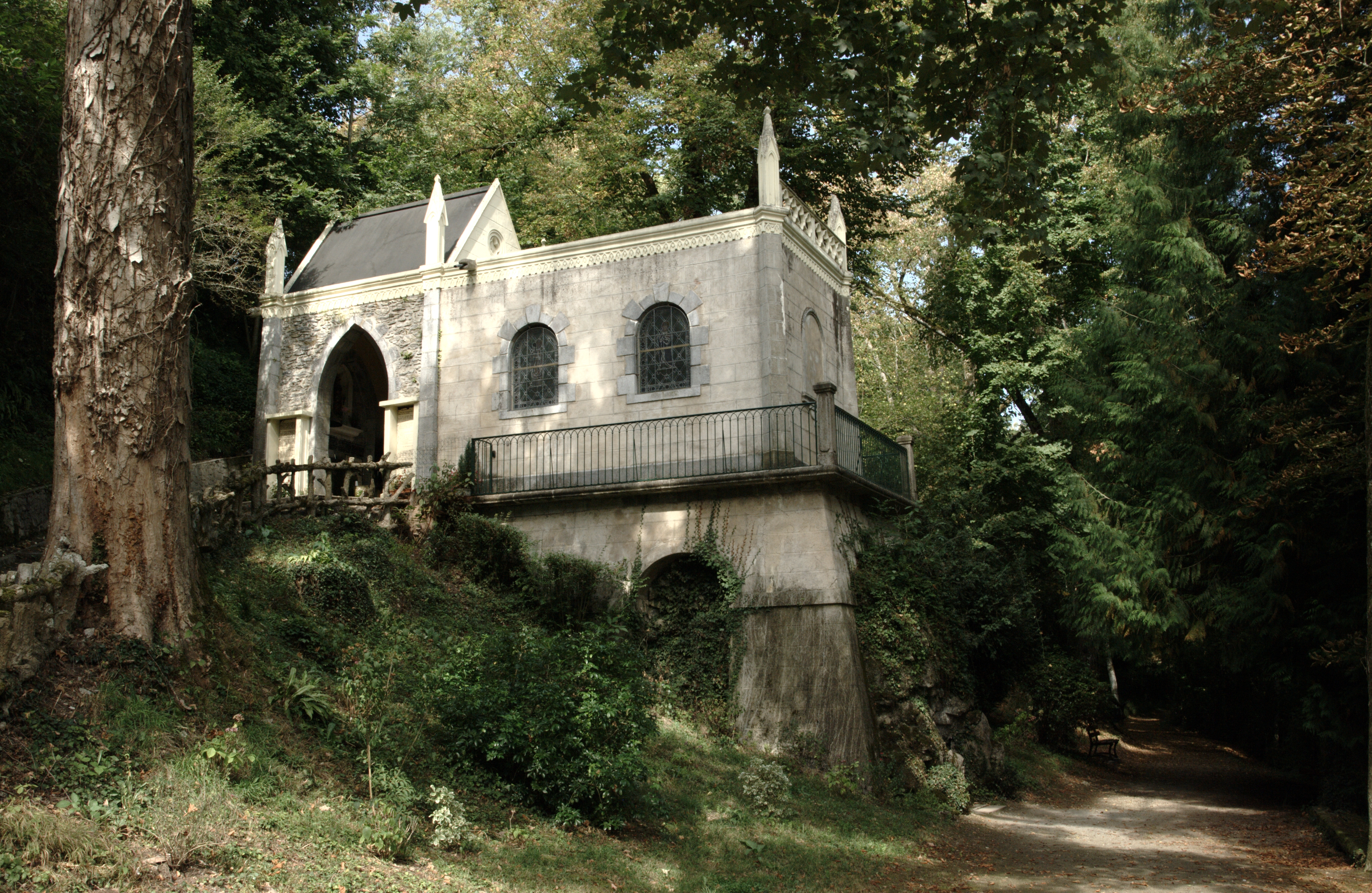
The oratory of Saint Cénéré at the edge of the Erve

== See also ==
- Communes of the Mayenne department
