= Giuseppe Garibaldi =

Italian patriot and general (1807–1882)

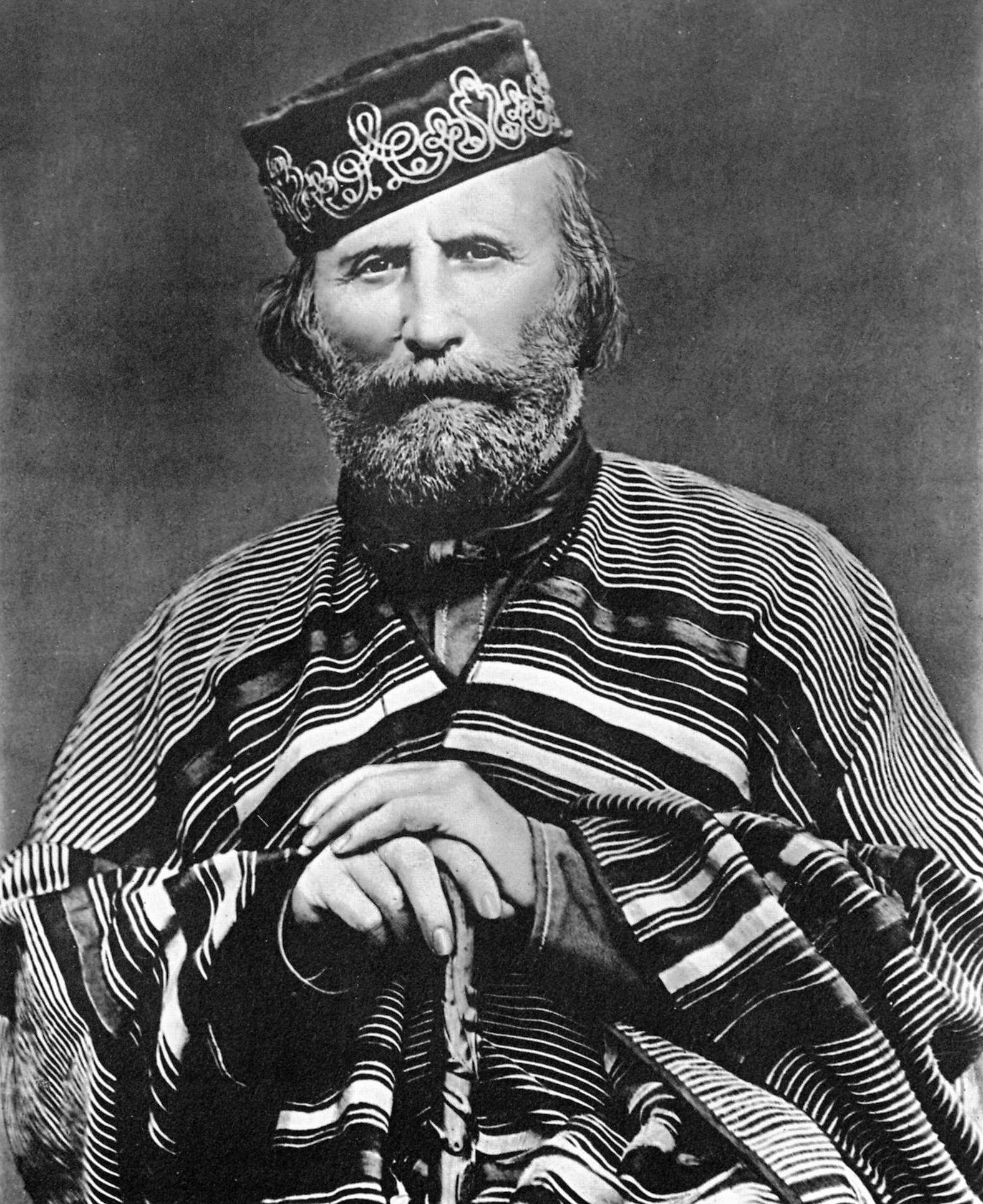
- Garibaldi in 1866

Member of the Chamber of Deputies
- In office 18 February 1861 – 2 June 1882
- Constituency: Naples (1861–1865); Andria (1865–1867); Ozieri (1867–1870); Rome (1870–1882)

Dictator of Sicily
- In office 17 May 1860 – 4 November 1860
- Preceded by: Position established
- Succeeded by: Position abolished

Personal details
- Born: Joseph-Marie Garibaldi; 4 July 1807 Nice (Note: Then part of County of Nice, was annexed by France from 1796 to 1814, before re-annexation in 1860.)
- Died: 2 June 1882 (aged 74) Caprera, Italy
- Party: Young Italy (1831–1848); Action Party (1848–1867); Historical Left (1867–1877); Extreme Left (1877–1882)
- Spouses: Ana Maria de Jesus Ribeiro (m. 1842; died 1849) Giuseppina Raimondi (m. 1860; sep. 1860) Francesca Armosino (m. 1880)
- Children: 8, including Menotti and Ricciotti

Military service
- Allegiance: List of allegiances: Riograndense Republic; Juliana Republic; Colorado Party; Unitarian Party; Roman Republic; Kingdom of Sardinia; Kingdom of Italy; French Third Republic
- Branch: Royal Sardinian Army; Royal Italian Army
- Service years: 1835–1871
- Rank: General
- Commands: Hunters of the Alps; International Legion; Army of the Vosges
- Wars: Ragamuffin War: Capture of Laguna; Battle of Imbituba; Recapture of Laguna; Battle of Santa Vitória; Battle of Curitibanos; Battle of São José do Norte; Uruguayan Civil War: Great Siege of Montevideo; Uruguay River pillage; Italian Unification Wars: 1st War of Independence; Battle of Novara; Assault on Rome; 2nd War of Independence; Battle of Varese; Expedition of the Thousand; Battle of Calatafimi; Battle of Milazzo; Battle of Volturnus; Battle of Aspromonte; 3rd War of Independence; Battle of Bezzecca; Invasion of Trentino; Battle of Mentana; Franco-Prussian War: Battles of Dijon

Giuseppe Maria Garibaldi (Italian: [dʒuˈzɛppe ɡariˈbaldi]; (Note: In his native Ligurian language, he is known as Gioxeppe Gaibado (pronounced [dʒɔːˈʒɛpːe ɡajˈbaːdu]). In his particular Niçard dialect of Ligurian, he was known as Jousé [dʒuˈze] or Josep [dʒuˈzep].) 4 July 1807 – 2 June 1882) was an Italian general, revolutionary and republican. He contributed to the unification of Italy (Risorgimento) and the creation of the Kingdom of Italy. He is considered to be one of Italy's "fathers of the fatherland", along with Camillo Benso di Cavour, King Victor Emmanuel II and Giuseppe Mazzini. Garibaldi is also known as the "Hero of the Two Worlds" because of his military enterprises in South America and Europe.

Garibaldi was a follower of the Italian nationalist Mazzini and embraced the republican nationalism of the Young Italy movement. He became a supporter of Italian unification under a democratic republican government. However, breaking with Mazzini, he pragmatically allied himself with the monarchist Cavour and the Kingdom of Sardinia in the struggle for independence, subordinating his republican ideals to his nationalist ones until Italy was unified. After participating in an uprising in Piedmont, he was sentenced to death, but escaped and sailed to South America, where he spent 14 years in exile, during which he took part in several wars and learned the art of guerrilla warfare. In 1835 he joined the rebels known as the Ragamuffins (farrapos), in the Ragamuffin War in Brazil, and took up their cause of establishing the Riograndense Republic and later the Catarinense Republic. Garibaldi also became involved in the Uruguayan Civil War, raising an Italian force known as Redshirts, and is still celebrated as an important contributor to Uruguay's reconstitution.

In 1848, Garibaldi returned to Italy. He commanded and fought in military campaigns that eventually led to the Italian unification. The provisional government of Milan made him a general and the Minister of War promoted him to General of the Roman Republic in 1849. When the war of independence broke out in April 1859, Garibaldi led his Hunters of the Alps in the capture of major cities in Lombardy, including Varese and Como, until he reached the frontier of South Tyrol; the war ended with the acquisition of Lombardy. The following year, 1860, he led the Expedition of the Thousand on behalf of, and with the consent of, Victor Emmanuel II, King of Sardinia. The expedition was a success and concluded with the annexation of Sicily, Southern Italy, Marche and Umbria to the Kingdom of Sardinia before the creation of a unified Kingdom of Italy on 17 March 1861. His last military campaign took place during the Franco-Prussian War as commander of the Army of the Vosges.

Garibaldi became an international figurehead for national independence and republican ideals, and is considered by twentieth-century historiography and popular culture as Italy's greatest national hero. He was showered with admiration and praise by many contemporary intellectuals and political figures, including Abraham Lincoln, William Brown, Francesco de Sanctis, Victor Hugo, Alexandre Dumas, Malwida von Meysenbug, George Sand, Charles Dickens, and Friedrich Engels. Garibaldi also inspired later figures like Jawaharlal Nehru and Che Guevara. Historian A. J. P. Taylor called him "the only wholly admirable figure in modern history". The volunteers who followed Garibaldi during his campaigns were known as the Garibaldini or Redshirts, after the color of the shirts that they wore in lieu of a uniform.

== Early life ==
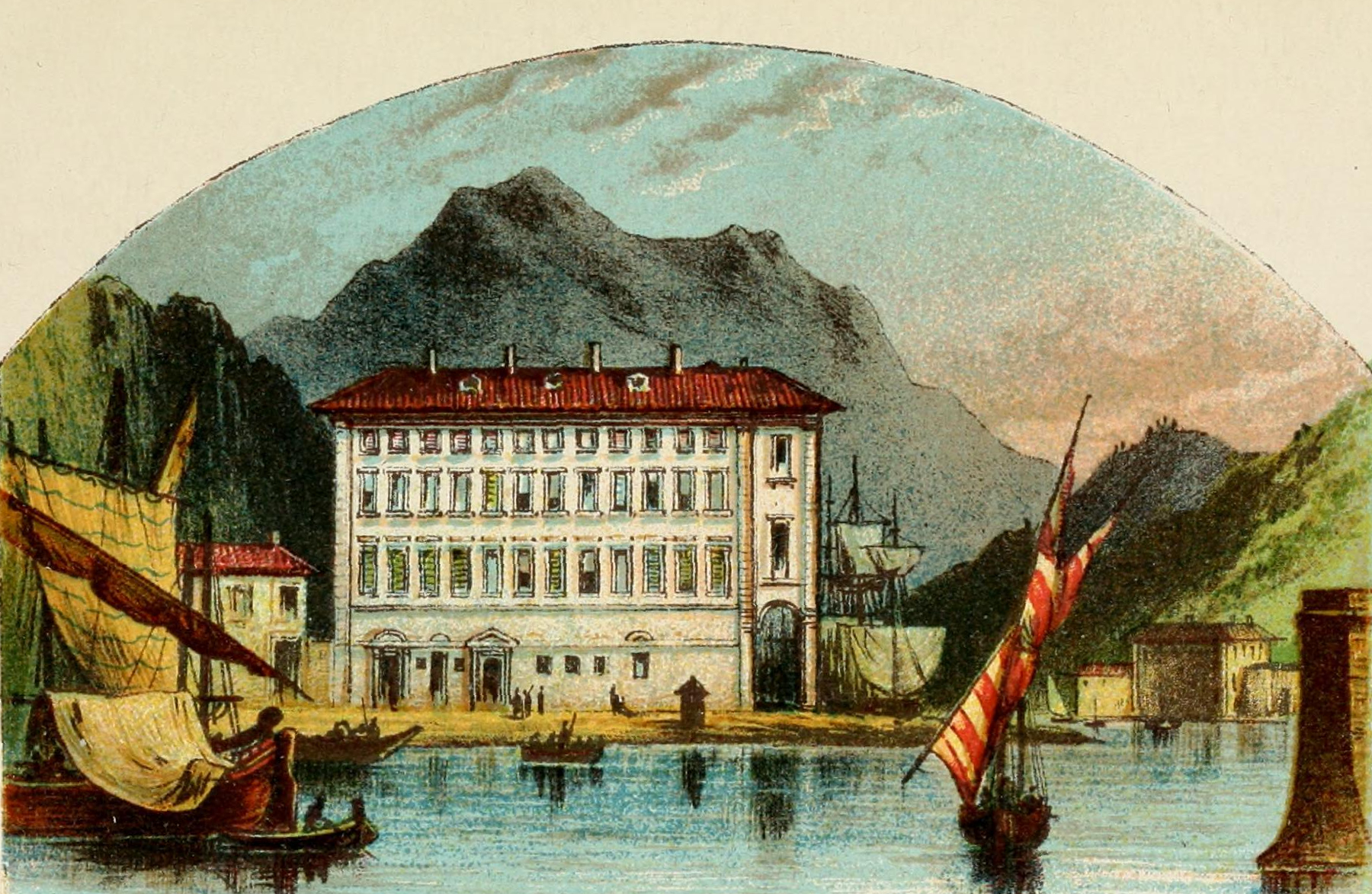
The house in which Garibaldi was born

Garibaldi was born and christened Joseph-Marie Garibaldi (Note: Pronounced in French as [ʒozɛf maʁi ɡaʁibaldi].) on 4 July 1807 in Nice, to the Ligurian family of Domenico Garibaldi from Chiavari and Maria Rosa Nicoletta Raimondi from Loano. In 1814, the Congress of Vienna returned Nice to Victor Emmanuel I of Sardinia. (Nice would be returned to France in 1860 by the Treaty of Turin, over the objections of Garibaldi.)

Garibaldi's family's involvement in coastal trade drew him to a life at sea.

He lived in the Pera district of Istanbul from 1828 to 1832. He became an instructor and taught Italian, French, and mathematics in the Ottoman Empire. Garibaldi had close ties with the vast Sardinian exile network in the Ottoman Empire, befriending people such as Giovanni Timoteo Calosso.

In April 1833, he travelled to Taganrog, in the Russian Empire, aboard the schooner Clorinda with a shipment of oranges. During ten days in port, he met Giovanni Battista Cuneo from Oneglia, a politically active immigrant and member of the secret Young Italy movement of Giuseppe Mazzini. Mazzini was a passionate proponent of Italian unification as a liberal republic via political and social reform.

In November 1833, Garibaldi met Mazzini in Genoa, starting a long relationship that later became troubled. He joined the Carbonari revolutionary association, and in February 1834 participated in a failed Mazzinian insurrection in Piedmont.

== South America ==
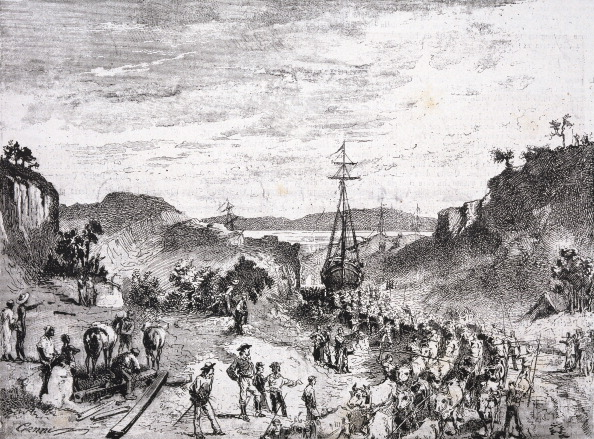
Garibaldi and his men carrying boats from Lagoa dos Patos to Tramandahy lake during the war in Rio Grande do Sul

Garibaldi first sailed to the Beylik of Tunis before eventually finding his way to the Empire of Brazil. Once there, he took up the cause of the Riograndense Republic in its attempt to separate from Brazil, joining the rebels known as the Ragamuffins in the Ragamuffin War of 1835.

During this war, he met Ana Maria de Jesus Ribeiro da Silva, commonly known as Anita. When the rebels proclaimed the Catarinense Republic in the Brazilian province of Santa Catarina in 1839, she joined him aboard his ship, Rio Pardo, and fought alongside him at the battles of Imbituba and Laguna.

In 1841, Garibaldi and Anita moved to Montevideo, Uruguay, where Garibaldi worked as a trader and schoolmaster. The couple married in Church of St. Francis of Assisi in the Ciudad Vieja neighborhood, the following year. They had four children; Domenico Menotti (1840–1903), Rosa (1843–1845), Teresa Teresita (1845–1903), and Ricciotti (1847–1924). A skilled horsewoman, Anita is said to have taught Giuseppe about the gaucho culture of Argentina, southern Brazil and Uruguay. Around this time he adopted his distinctive style of clothing—wearing the red shirt, poncho, and hat commonly worn by gauchos.

In 1842, Garibaldi took command of the Uruguayan fleet and raised an Italian Legion of soldiers—known as Redshirts—for the Uruguayan Civil War. This recruitment was possible as Montevideo had a large Italian population at the time: 4,205 out of a total population of 30,000 according to an 1843 census.

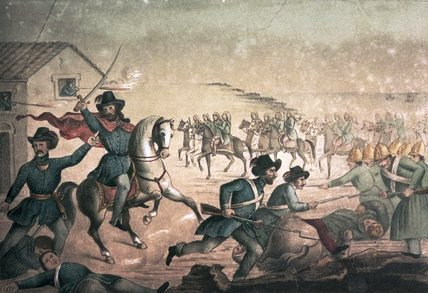
Garibaldi during the battle of Sant'Antonio, 1846

Garibaldi aligned his forces with the Uruguayan Colorados led by Fructuoso Rivera and Joaquín Suárez, who were aligned with the Argentine Unitarian Party. This faction received some support from the French and British in their struggle against the forces of former Uruguayan president Manuel Oribe's Blancos, which was also aligned with Argentine Federales under the rule of Buenos Aires caudillo Juan Manuel de Rosas. The Italian Legion adopted a black flag that represented Italy in mourning, with a volcano at the centre that symbolized the dormant power in their homeland. Though contemporary sources do not mention the Redshirts, popular history asserts that the legion first wore them in Uruguay, getting them from a factory in Montevideo that had intended to export them to the slaughterhouses of Argentina. These shirts became the symbol of Garibaldi and his followers.

Between 1842 and 1848, Garibaldi defended Montevideo against forces led by Oribe. In 1845, he managed to occupy Colonia del Sacramento and Martín García Island, and led the infamous sacks of Martín García island and Gualeguaychú during the Anglo-French blockade of the Río de la Plata. Garibaldi escaped with his life after being defeated in the Costa Brava combat, delivered on 15 and 16 August 1842, thanks to the mercy of Admiral William Brown. The Argentines, wanting to pursue him to finish him off, were stopped by Brown who exclaimed "let him escape, that gringo is a brave man." Years later, a grandson of Garibaldi would be named William, in honour of Admiral Brown. Adopting amphibious guerrilla tactics, Garibaldi later achieved two victories during 1846, in the Battle of Cerro and the Battle of San Antonio del Santo.

== Induction to Freemasonry ==
Garibaldi joined Freemasonry during his exile, taking advantage of the asylum the lodges offered to political refugees from European countries. At the age of 37, during 1844, Garibaldi was initiated in the Asilo de la Virtud Lodge of Montevideo. This was an irregular lodge under a Brazilian Freemasonry not recognized by the main international masonic obediences, such as the United Grand Lodge of England or the Grand Orient de France.

While Garibaldi had little use for Masonic rituals, he was an active Freemason and regarded Freemasonry as a network that united progressive men as brothers both within nations and as a global community. Garibaldi was eventually elected as the Grand Master of the Grand Orient of Italy.

Garibaldi regularized his position later in 1844, joining the lodge Les Amis de la Patrie of Montevideo under the Grand Orient of France.

=== Election of Pope Pius IX, 1846 ===
The fate of his homeland continued to concern Garibaldi. The election of Pope Pius IX in 1846 caused a sensation among Italian patriots, both at home and in exile. Pius's initial reforms seemed to identify him as the liberal pope called for by Vincenzo Gioberti, who went on to lead the unification of Italy. When news of these reforms reached Montevideo, Garibaldi wrote to the Pope:

If these hands, used to fighting, would be acceptable to His Holiness, we most thankfully dedicate them to the service of him who deserves so well of the Church and of the fatherland. Joyful indeed shall we and our companions in whose name we speak be, if we may be allowed to shed our blood in defence of Pius IX's work of redemption.

Mazzini, from exile, also applauded the early reforms of Pius IX. In 1847, Garibaldi offered the apostolic nuncio at Rio de Janeiro, Bedini, the service of his Italian Legion for the liberation of the peninsula. Then news of the outbreak of the Sicilian revolution of 1848 in January and revolutionary agitation elsewhere in Italy, encouraged Garibaldi to lead approximately 60 members of his legion home.

== Return to Italy ==
=== First Italian War of Independence ===
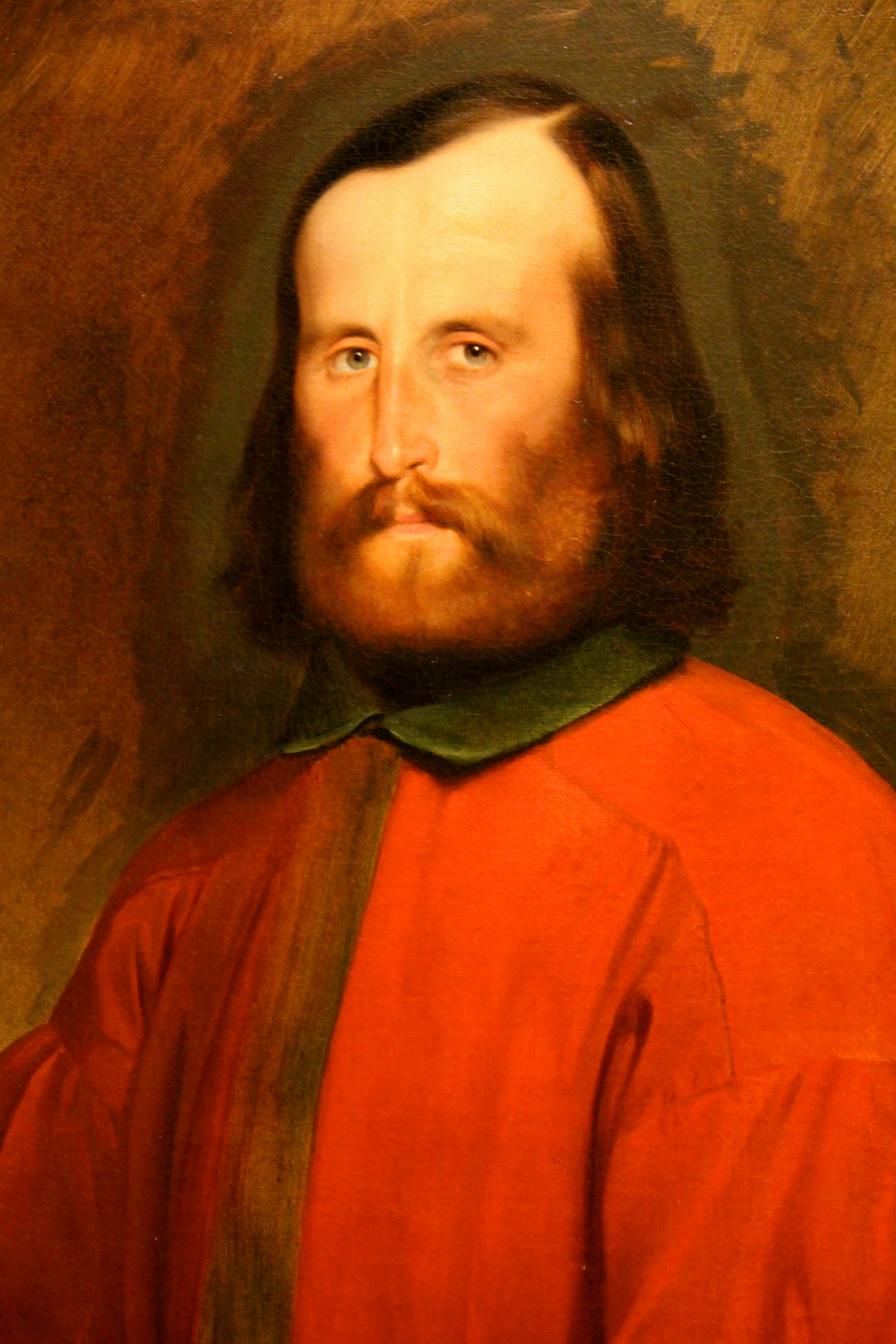
Portrait of Garibaldi in 1848, by Gaetano Gallino

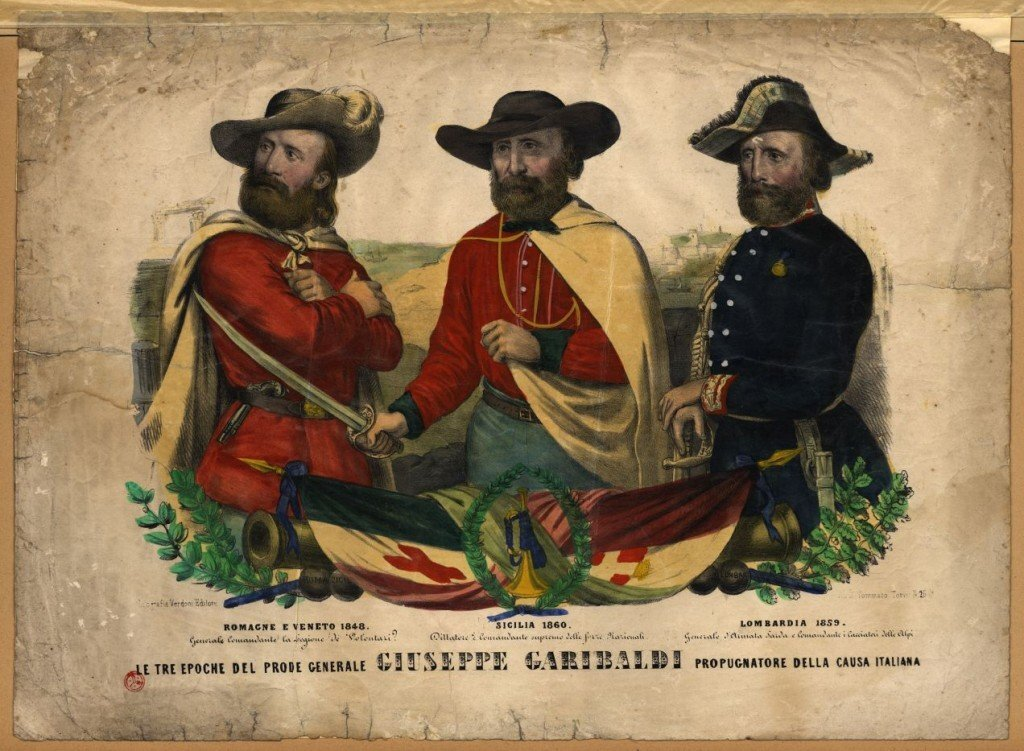
Popular print showing Garibaldi wearing uniforms of 1848, 1860 and 1859 wars

Garibaldi returned to Italy amidst the turmoil of the revolutions of 1848 in the Italian states and was one of the founders and leaders of the Action Party. Garibaldi offered his services to Charles Albert of Sardinia, who displayed some liberal inclinations, but he treated Garibaldi with coolness and distrust. Rebuffed by the Piedmontese, he and his followers crossed into Lombardy where they offered assistance to the provisional government of Milan, which had rebelled against the Austrian occupation. In the course of the following unsuccessful First Italian War of Independence, Garibaldi led his legion to two minor victories at Luino and Morazzone.

After the crushing Piedmontese defeat at the Battle of Novara on 23 March 1849, Garibaldi moved to Rome to support the Roman Republic recently proclaimed in the Papal States. However, a French force sent by Louis Napoleon threatened to topple it. At Mazzini's urging, Garibaldi took command of the defence of Rome. In fighting near Velletri, Achille Cantoni saved his life. After Cantoni's death, during the Battle of Mentana, Garibaldi wrote the novel Cantoni the Volunteer.

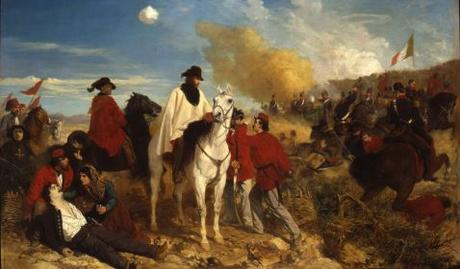
Garibaldi during the siege of Rome

On 30 April 1849, the Republican army, under Garibaldi's command, defeated a numerically far superior French army at the Porta San Pancrazio gate of Rome. Subsequently, French reinforcements arrived, and the Siege of Rome began on 1 June. Despite the resistance of the Republican army, the French prevailed on 29 June. On 30 June the Roman Assembly met and debated three options: surrender, continue fighting in the streets, or retreat from Rome to continue resistance from the Apennine Mountains. Garibaldi, having entered the chamber covered in blood, made a speech favouring the third option, ending with: Ovunque noi saremo, sarà Roma ("Wherever we will go, that will be Rome").

The sides negotiated a truce on 1–2 July, Garibaldi withdrew from Rome with 4,000 troops, and ceded his ambition to rouse popular rebellion against the Austrians in central Italy. The French Army entered Rome on 3 July and reestablished the Holy See's temporal power. Garibaldi and his forces, hunted by Austrian, French, Spanish, and Neapolitan troops, fled to the north, intending to reach Venice, where the Venetians were still resisting the Austrian siege. After an epic march, Garibaldi took temporary refuge in San Marino, with only 250 men having not abandoned him. Anita, who was carrying their fifth child, died near Comacchio during the retreat.

=== North America and the Pacific ===
Garibaldi eventually managed to reach Porto Venere, near La Spezia, but the Piedmontese government forced him to emigrate again. He went to Tangier, where he stayed with Francesco Carpanetto, a wealthy Italian merchant. Carpanetto suggested that he and some of his associates finance the purchase of a merchant ship, which Garibaldi would command. Garibaldi agreed, feeling that his political goals were, for the moment, unreachable, and he could at least earn a living.

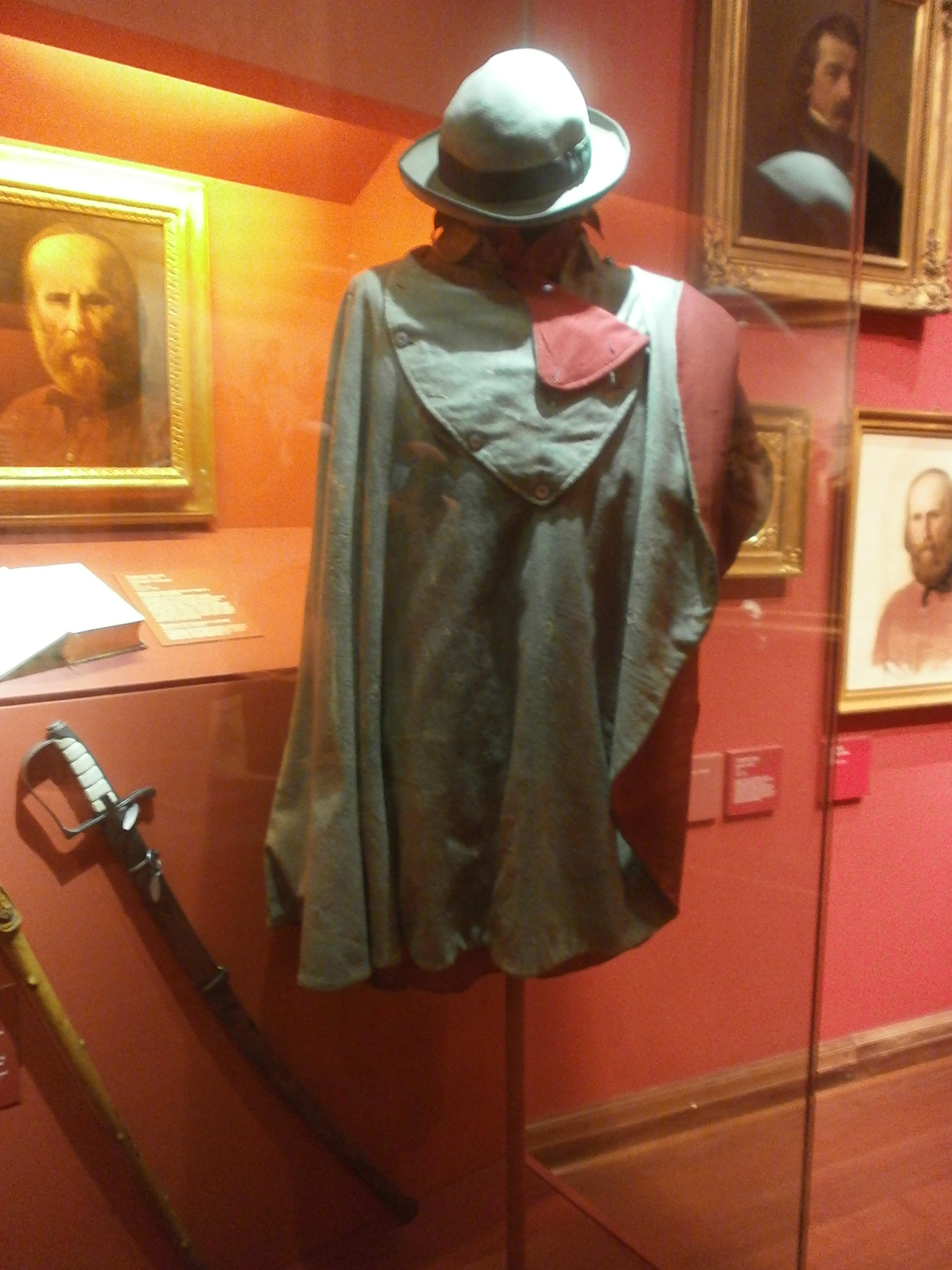
Garibaldi's poncho and red shirt at the Museum of the Risorgimento, Milan

The ship was to be purchased in the United States. Garibaldi went to New York City, arriving on 30 July 1850. However, the funds for buying a ship were lacking. While in New York, he stayed with various Italian friends, including some exiled revolutionaries. He attended the Masonic lodges of New York in 1850, where he met several supporters of democratic internationalism, whose minds were open to socialist thought, and to giving Freemasonry a strong anti-papal stance.

The inventor Antonio Meucci employed Garibaldi in his candle factory on Staten Island (the cottage where he stayed is listed on the U.S. National Register of Historic Places and is preserved as the Garibaldi Memorial). Garibaldi was not satisfied with this, and in April 1851 he left New York with his friend Carpanetto for Central America, where Carpanetto was establishing business operations. They first went to Nicaragua, and then to other parts of the region. Garibaldi accompanied Carpanetto as a companion, not a business partner, and used the name Giuseppe Pane.

Carpanetto went on to Lima, Peru, where a shipload of his goods was due, arriving late in 1851 with Garibaldi. En route, Garibaldi called on revolutionary heroine Manuela Sáenz. At Lima, Garibaldi was generally welcomed. A local Italian merchant, Pietro Denegri, gave him command of his ship Carmen for a trading voyage across the Pacific, for which he required Peruvian citizenship, which he obtained that year. Garibaldi took the Carmen to the Chincha Islands for a load of guano. Then on 10 January 1852, he sailed from Peru for Canton, China, arriving in April.

After side trips to Xiamen and Manila, Garibaldi brought the Carmen back to Peru via the Indian Ocean and the South Pacific, passing clear around the south coast of Australia. He visited Three Hummock Island in the Bass Strait. Garibaldi then took the Carmen on a second voyage: to the United States via Cape Horn with copper from Chile, and also wool. Garibaldi arrived in Boston and went on to New York. There he received a hostile letter from Denegri and resigned his command. Another Italian, Captain Figari, had just come to the U.S. to buy a ship and hired Garibaldi to take the ship to Europe. Figari and Garibaldi bought the Commonwealth in Baltimore, and Garibaldi left New York for the last time in November 1853. He sailed the Commonwealth to London, and then to Newcastle upon Tyne for coal.

=== Tyneside ===
The Commonwealth arrived on 21 March 1854. Garibaldi, already a popular figure on Tyneside, was welcomed enthusiastically by local working men—although the Newcastle Courant reported that he refused an invitation to dine with dignitaries in the city. He stayed in Huntingdon Place Tynemouth for a few days, and in South Shields on Tyneside for over a month, departing at the end of April 1854. During his stay, he was presented with an inscribed sword, which his grandson Giuseppe Garibaldi II later carried as a volunteer in British service in the Second Boer War. He then sailed to Genoa, where his five years of exile ended on 10 May 1854.

== Second Italian War of Independence ==
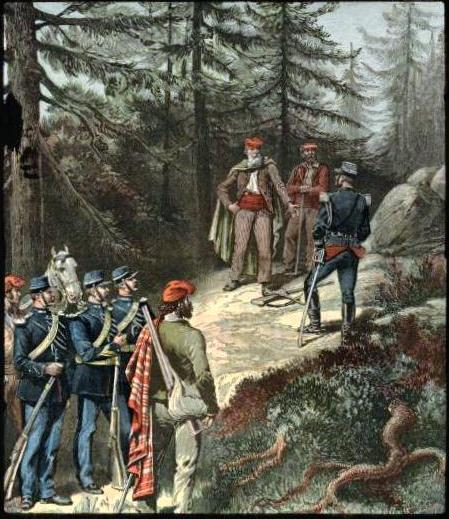
Garibaldi in the Alps

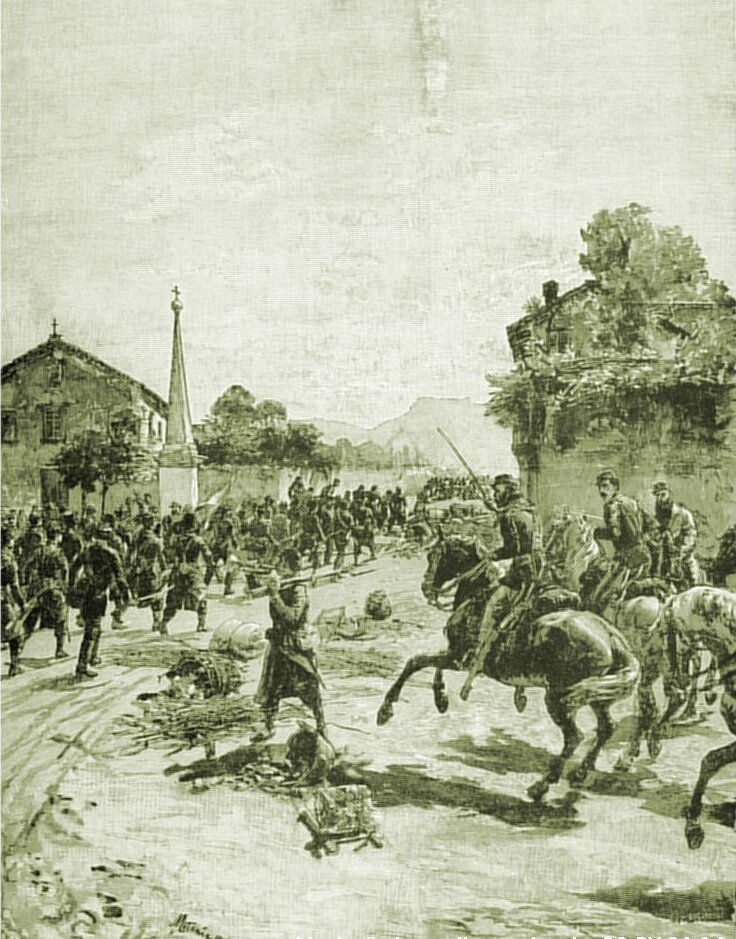
Battle of Varese

Garibaldi returned to Italy in 1854. Using an inheritance from the death of his brother, he bought half of the Italian island of Caprera (north of Sardinia), devoting himself to agriculture. In 1859, the Second Italian War of Independence (also known as the Franco-Austrian War) broke out in the midst of internal plots at the Sardinian government. Garibaldi was appointed major general and formed a volunteer unit named the Hunters of the Alps (Cacciatori delle Alpi). Thenceforth, Garibaldi abandoned Mazzini's republican ideal of the liberation of Italy, assuming that only the Sardinian monarchy could effectively achieve it. He and his volunteers won victories over the Austrians at Varese, Como, and other places.

Garibaldi was very displeased as his home city of Nice (Nizza in Italian) had been surrendered to the French in return for crucial military assistance. In April 1860, as deputy for Nice in the Piedmontese parliament at Turin, he vehemently attacked Camillo Benso, Count of Cavour, for ceding the County of Nice (Nizzardo) to Emperor Napoleon III of France. In the following years, Garibaldi (with other passionate Niçard Italians) promoted the Italian irredentism of his native city, supporting the Niçard Vespers riots in 1871.

== Campaign of 1860 ==
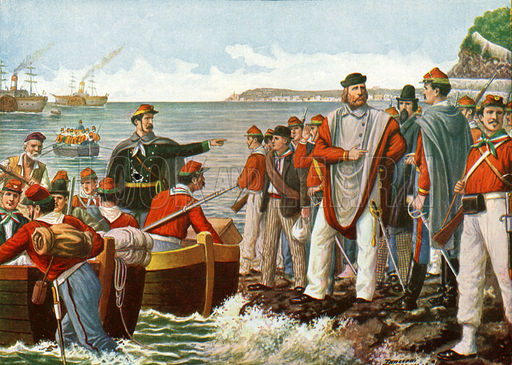
Garibaldi departing on the Expedition of the Thousand in 1860

On 24 January 1860, Garibaldi married 18-year-old Giuseppina Raimondi. Immediately after the wedding ceremony, she informed him that she was pregnant with another man's child and Garibaldi left her the same day. At the beginning of April 1860, uprisings in Messina and Palermo in the Kingdom of the Two Sicilies provided Garibaldi with an opportunity. He gathered a group of volunteers called i Mille (the Thousand), or the Redshirts as popularly known, in two ships named Il Piemonte and Il Lombardo, and left from Quarto, in Genoa, on 5 May in the evening and landed at Marsala, on the westernmost point of Sicily, on 11 May.

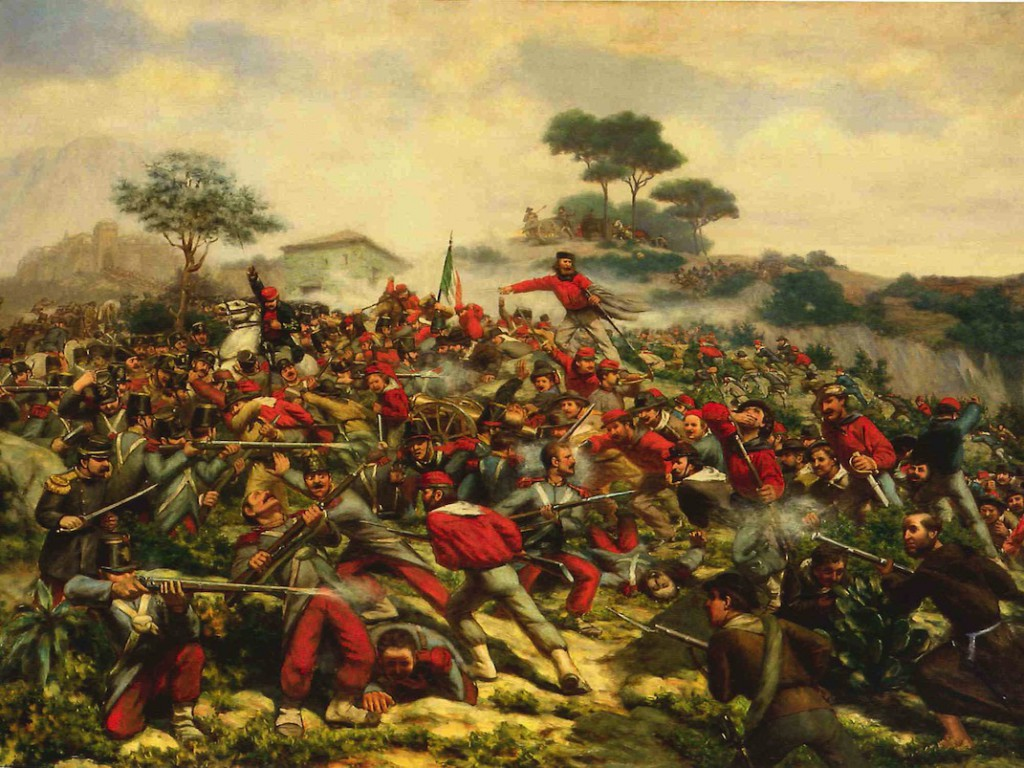
Battle of Calatafimi

Swelling the ranks of his army with scattered bands of local rebels, Garibaldi led 800 volunteers to victory over an enemy force of 1,500 at the Battle of Calatafimi on 15 May. He used the counter-intuitive tactic of an uphill bayonet charge. He saw that the hill was terraced, and the terraces would shelter his advancing men. Though small by comparison with the coming clashes at Palermo, Milazzo, and Volturno, this battle was decisive in establishing Garibaldi's power on the island. An apocryphal but realistic story had him say to his lieutenant Nino Bixio, "Here we either make Italy, or we die." His Neapolitan adversaries now fought for him, which led to accusations of bribery being made against their leader, Francesco Landi.

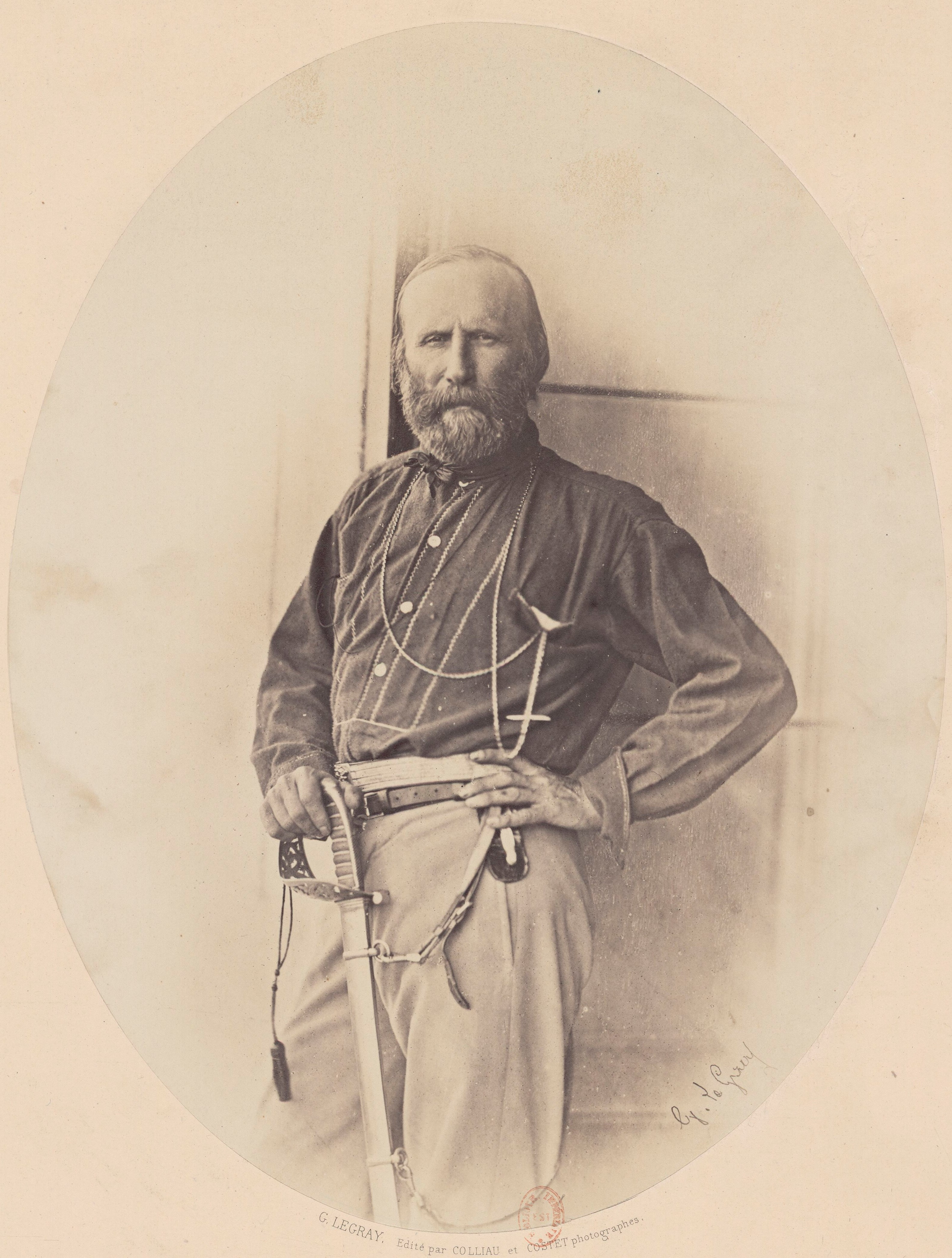
Garibaldi in Palermo in 1860, photographed by Gustave Le Gray

The next day, he declared himself dictator of Sicily in the name of Victor Emmanuel II of Italy. He advanced to the outskirts of Palermo, the capital of the island, and launched a siege on 27 May. He had the support of many inhabitants, who rose up against the garrison, but before they could take the city, reinforcements arrived and bombarded the city nearly to ruins. At this time, a British admiral intervened and facilitated a truce, by which the Neapolitan royal troops and warships surrendered the city and departed. The young Henry Adams—later to become a distinguished American writer—visited the city in June and described the situation, along with his meeting with Garibaldi, in a long and vivid letter to his older brother Charles. Historians Clough et al. argue that Garibaldi's Thousand were students, independent artisans, and professionals, not peasants. The support given by Sicilian peasants was not out of a sense of patriotism but from their hatred of exploitive landlords and oppressive Neapolitan officials. Garibaldi himself had no interest in social revolution and instead sided with the Sicilian landlords against the rioting peasants.

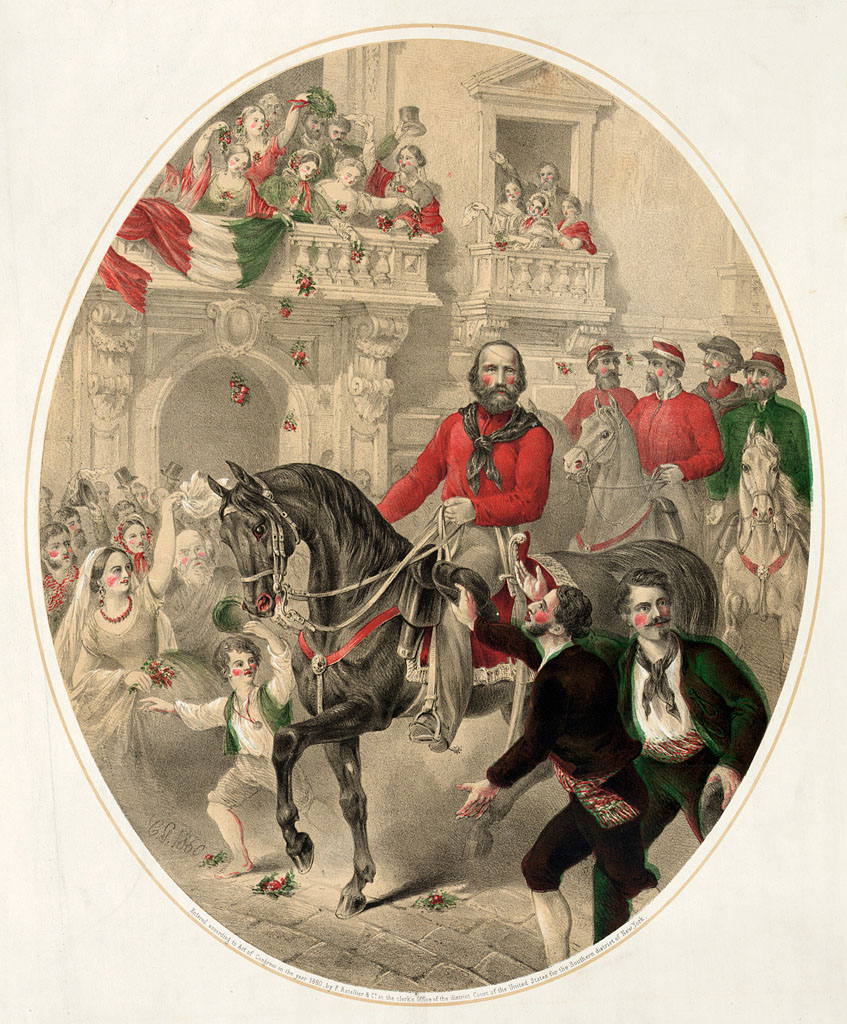
People cheering as Garibaldi rides into Naples on horseback, 7 September 1860

By conquering Palermo, Garibaldi had won a signal victory. He gained worldwide renown and the adulation of Italians. Faith in his prowess was so strong that doubt, confusion, and dismay seized even the Neapolitan court. Six weeks later, he marched against Messina in the east of the island, winning a ferocious and difficult Battle of Milazzo. By the end of July, only the citadel resisted.

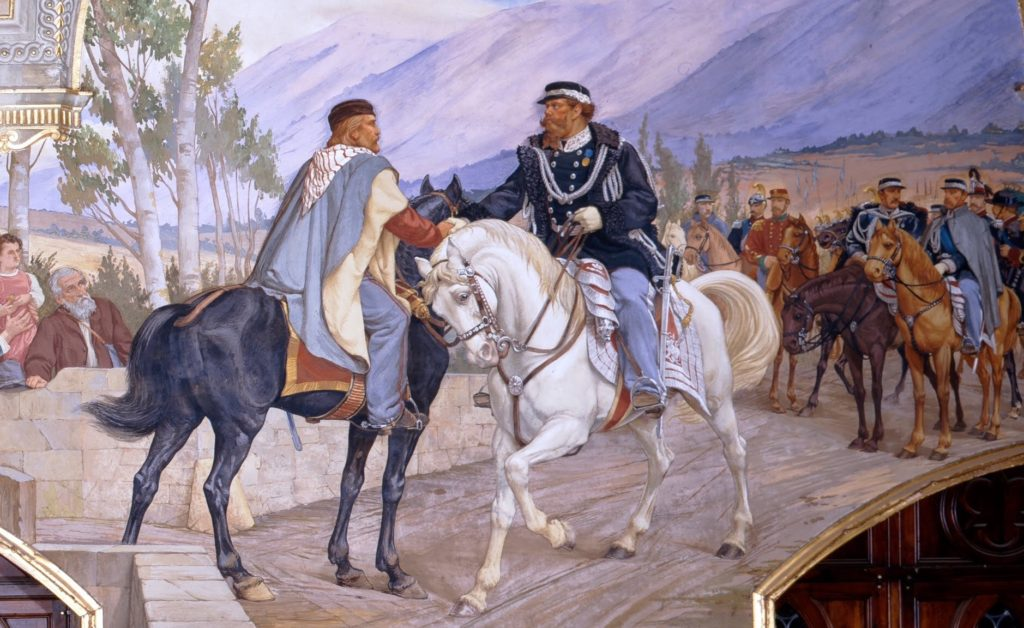
Meeting between Garibaldi and Victor Emmanuel II on the bridge of Teano on 26 October 1860

Having conquered Sicily, he crossed the Strait of Messina and marched north. Garibaldi's progress was met with more celebration than resistance, and on 7 September he entered the capital city of Naples, by train. Despite taking Naples, however, he had not to this point defeated the Neapolitan army. Garibaldi's volunteer army of 24,000 was not able to conclusively defeat the reorganized Neapolitan army—about 25,000 men—on 30 September at the Battle of Volturno. This was the largest battle he ever fought, but its outcome was effectively decided by the arrival of the Royal Sardinian Army.

Meanwhile, Garibaldi's victories started to cause disquiet to the Piedmont, and particularly the Sardinian prime minister, Camillo Benso, Count of Cavour. He feared that, should the revolutionaries succeed in conquering the entire Neapolitan state, they would then invade the Papal States, which would lead to France intervening. The Piedmontese themselves had conquered most of the Pope's territories in their march south to meet Garibaldi, but they had deliberately avoided Rome, the capital of the Papal state. Garibaldi deeply disliked Cavour. To an extent, he simply mistrusted Cavour's pragmatism and realpolitik, but he also bore a personal grudge for Cavour's trading away his home city of Nice to the French the previous year. On the other hand, he supported the Sardinian monarch, Victor Emmanuel II, despite his dislike of royalty, who he admired as a champion of Italian independence. In his famous meeting with Victor Emmanuel at Teano on 26 October 1860, Garibaldi greeted him as King of Italy and shook his hand. Garibaldi rode into Naples at the king's side on 7 November, then retired to the rocky island of Caprera, refusing to accept any reward for his services.

== Aftermath ==
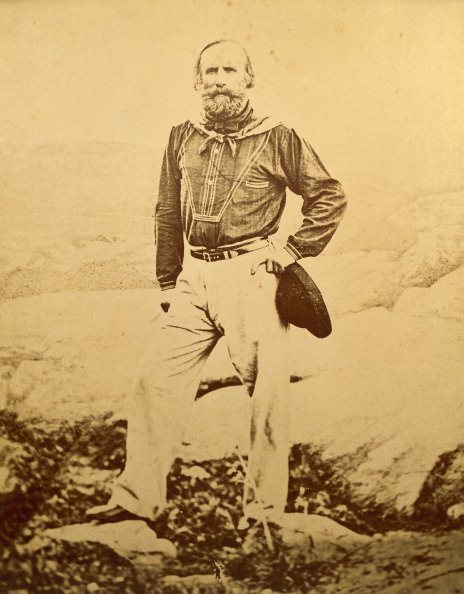
Garibaldi on Caprera

At the outbreak of the American Civil War (in 1861), Garibaldi was a very popular figure. The 39th New York Volunteer Infantry Regiment was named Garibaldi Guard after him. Garibaldi expressed interest in aiding the Union, and he was offered a major general's commission in the U.S. Army through a letter from Secretary of State William H. Seward to Henry Shelton Sanford, the U.S. Minister at Brussels, 27 July 1861. On 9 September 1861, Sanford met with Garibaldi and reported the result of the meeting to Seward:

He said that the only way in which he could render service, as he ardently desired to do, to the cause of the United States, was as Commander-in-chief of its forces, that he would only go as such, and with the additional contingent power—to be governed by events—of declaring the abolition of slavery—that he would be of little use without the first, and without the second it would appear like a civil war in which the world at large could have little interest or sympathy.

But Abraham Lincoln was not ready to free the slaves; Sanford's meeting with Garibaldi occurred a year before Lincoln issued the preliminary Emancipation Proclamation. Sanford's mission was hopeless, and Garibaldi did not join the Union army. A historian of the American Civil War, Don H. Doyle, however, wrote, "Garibaldi's full-throated endorsement of the Union cause roused popular support just as news of the Emancipation Proclamation broke in Europe." On 6 August 1863, after Lincoln had issued the final Emancipation Proclamation, Garibaldi wrote to Lincoln, "Posterity will call you the great emancipator, a more enviable title than any crown could be, and greater than any merely mundane treasure."

On 5 October 1860, Garibaldi set up the International Legion bringing together different national divisions of French, Poles, Swiss, Germans and other nationalities, with a view not just of finishing the liberation of Italy, but also of their homelands. With the motto "Free from the Alps to the Adriatic", the unification movement set its gaze on Rome and Venice. Mazzini was discontented with the perpetuation of monarchial government, and continued to agitate for a republic. Garibaldi, frustrated at inaction by the king, and bristling over perceived snubs, organized a new venture. This time, he intended to take on the Papal States.

== Expedition against Rome ==
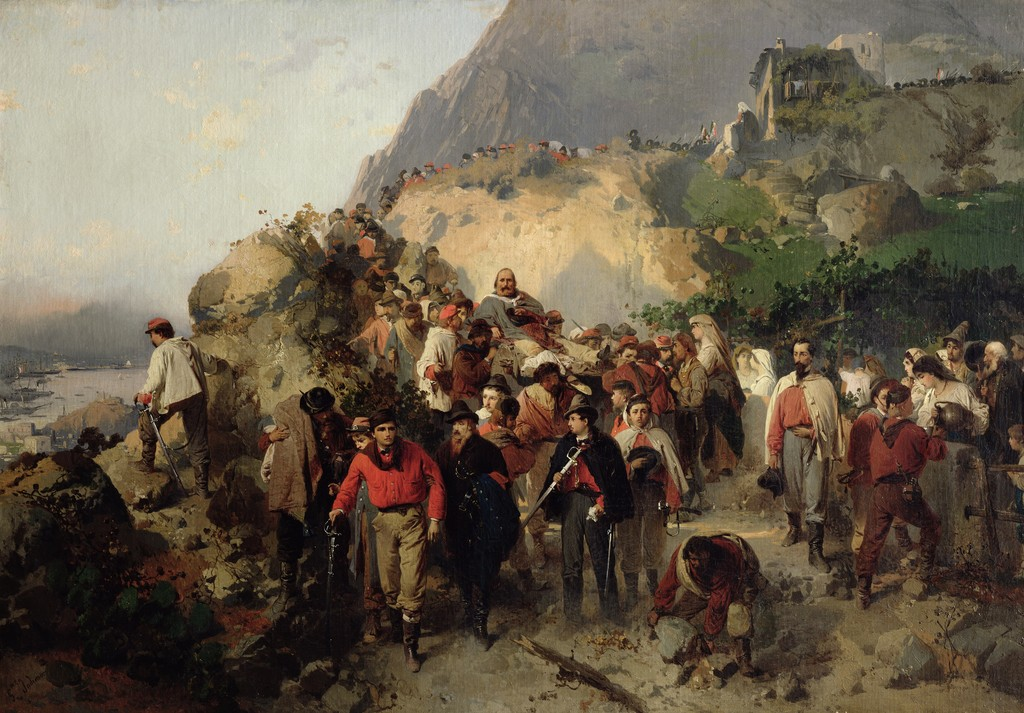
Garibaldi in the Aspromonte Mountains (oil on canvas)

Garibaldi himself was intensely anti-Catholic and anti-papal. His efforts to overthrow the pope by military action mobilized anti-Catholic support. On 28 September 1862, 500 Irish labourers disrupted a pro-Garibaldi meeting in London by chanting "God and Rome", which triggered weeks of ethnic conflict between Protestants and Irish Catholics. Garibaldi's hostility to the pope's temporal domain was viewed with great distrust by Catholics around the world, and the French Emperor Napoleon III had guaranteed the independence of Rome from Italy by stationing a French garrison there. Victor Emmanuel was wary of the international repercussions of attacking Rome and the pope's seat there, and discouraged his subjects from participating in revolutionary ventures with such intentions. Nonetheless, Garibaldi believed he had the secret support of his government. Once he was excommunicated by the pope, he chose the Protestant pastor Alessandro Gavazzi as his army chaplain.

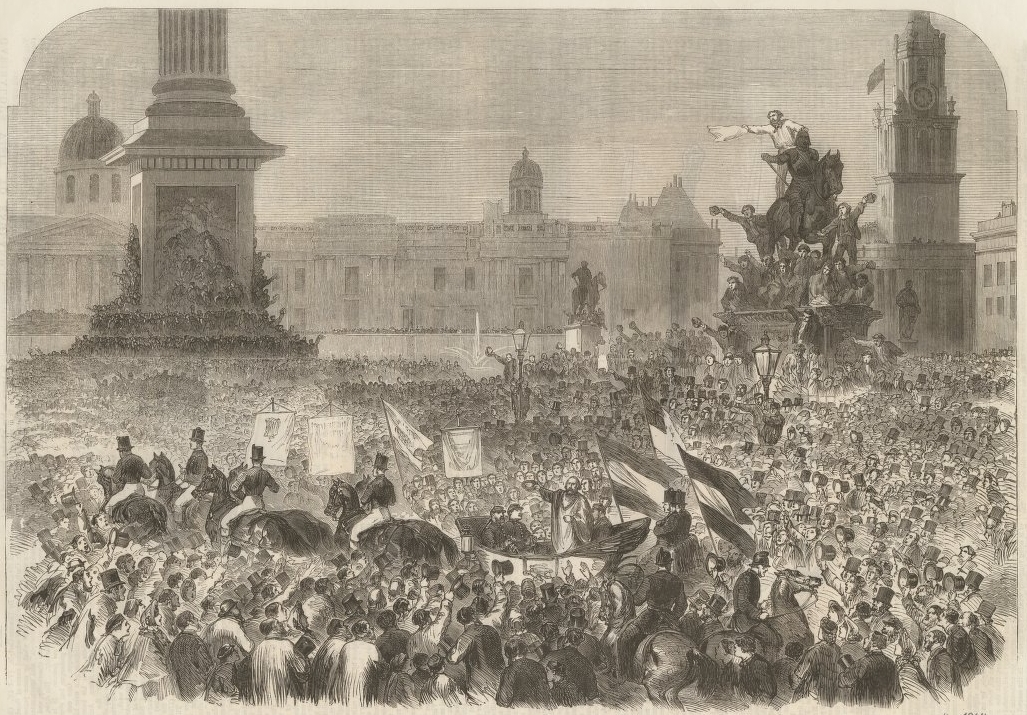
Garibaldi is welcomed by cheering crowds in Trafalgar Square as he arrives in London, England.

In June 1862, he sailed from Genoa to Palermo to gather volunteers for the impending campaign, under the slogan Roma o Morte ("Rome or Death"). An enthusiastic party quickly joined him, and he turned for Messina, hoping to cross to the mainland there. He arrived with a force of around two thousand, but the garrison proved loyal to the king's instructions and barred his passage. They turned south and set sail from Catania, where Garibaldi declared that he would enter Rome as a victor or perish beneath its walls. He landed at Melito di Porto Salvo on 14 August and marched at once into the Calabrian mountains.

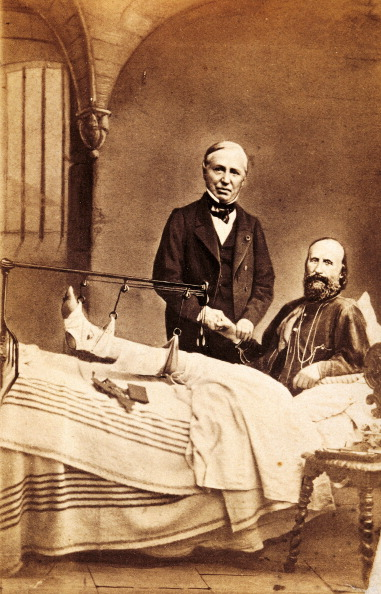
Garibaldi after being wounded on the Aspromonte Massif

Far from supporting this endeavour, the Italian government was quite disapproving. General Enrico Cialdini dispatched a division of the regular army, under Colonel Emilio Pallavicini, against the volunteer bands. On 28 August, the two forces met in the rugged Aspromonte. One of the regulars fired a chance shot, and several volleys followed, killing a few of the volunteers. The fighting ended quickly, as Garibaldi forbade his men to return fire on fellow subjects of the Kingdom of Italy. Many of the volunteers were taken prisoner, including Garibaldi, who had been wounded by a shot in the foot. The episode was the origin of a famous Italian nursery rhyme: Garibaldi fu ferito ("Garibaldi was wounded").

A government steamer took him to a prison at Varignano near La Spezia, where he was held in a sort of honourable imprisonment and underwent a tedious and painful operation to heal his wound. His venture had failed, but he was consoled by Europe's sympathy and continued interest. After he regained his health, the government released Garibaldi and let him return to Caprera.

En route to London in 1864 he stopped briefly in Malta, where many admirers visited him in his hotel. Protests by opponents of his anticlericalism were suppressed by the authorities. In London, his presence was received with enthusiasm by the population. He met the British prime minister Viscount Palmerston, as well as revolutionaries then living in exile in the city. At that time, his ambitious international project included the liberation of a range of occupied nations, such as Croatia, Greece, and Hungary. He also visited Bedford and was given a tour of the Britannia Iron Works, where he planted a tree (which was cut down in 1944 due to decay).

== Final struggle with Austria ==
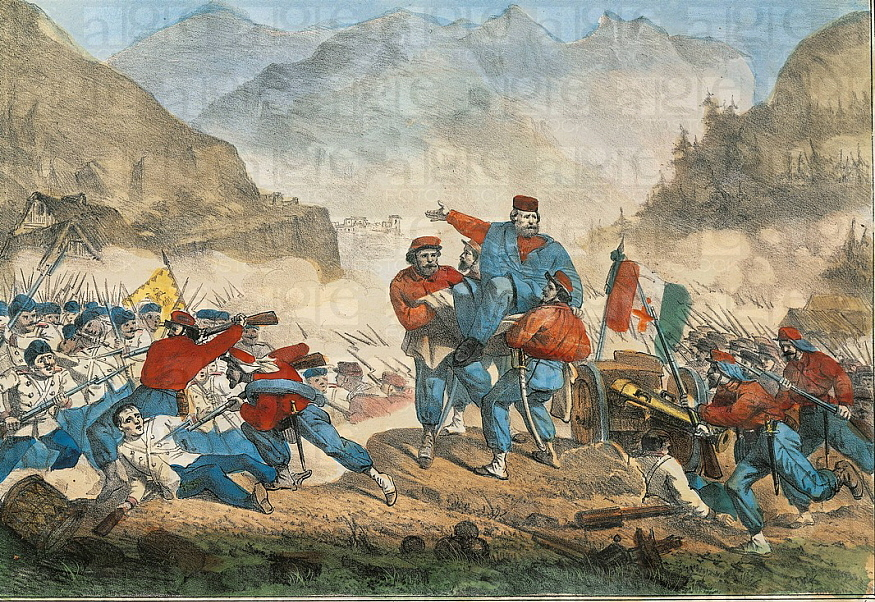
Battle of Bezzecca

Garibaldi took up arms again in 1866, this time with the full support of the Italian government. The Austro-Prussian War had broken out, and Italy had allied with Prussia against the Austrian Empire in the hope of taking Venetia from Austrian rule in the Third Italian War of Independence. Garibaldi gathered again his Hunters of the Alps, now some 40,000 strong, and led them into the Trentino. He defeated the Austrians at Bezzecca, and made for Trento.

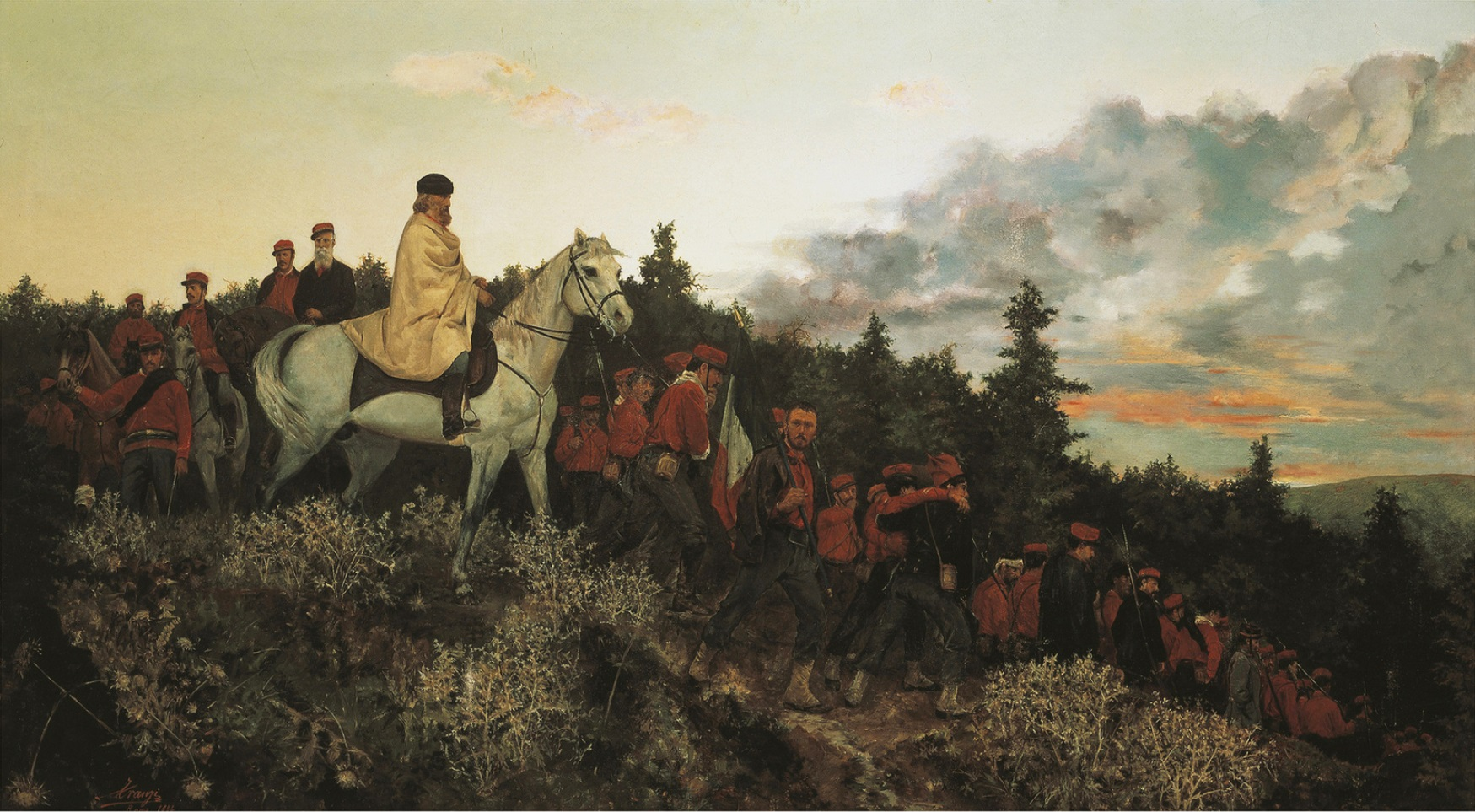
Garibaldi at Mentana, 3 November 1867

The Italian regular forces were defeated at Lissa on the sea, and made little progress on land after the disaster of Custoza. The sides signed an armistice by which Austria ceded Venetia to Italy, but this result was largely due to Prussia's successes on the northern front. Garibaldi's advance through Trentino was for nought, and he was ordered to stop his advance to Trento. Garibaldi answered with a short telegram from the main square of Bezzecca with the famous motto: Obbedisco! ("I obey").

After the war, Garibaldi led a political party that agitated for the capture of Rome, the peninsula's ancient capital. In 1867, he again marched on the city, but the Papal army, supported by a French auxiliary force, proved a match for his badly armed volunteers. He was shot in the leg in the Battle of Mentana, and had to withdraw from the Papal territory. The Italian government again imprisoned him for some time, after which he returned to Caprera.

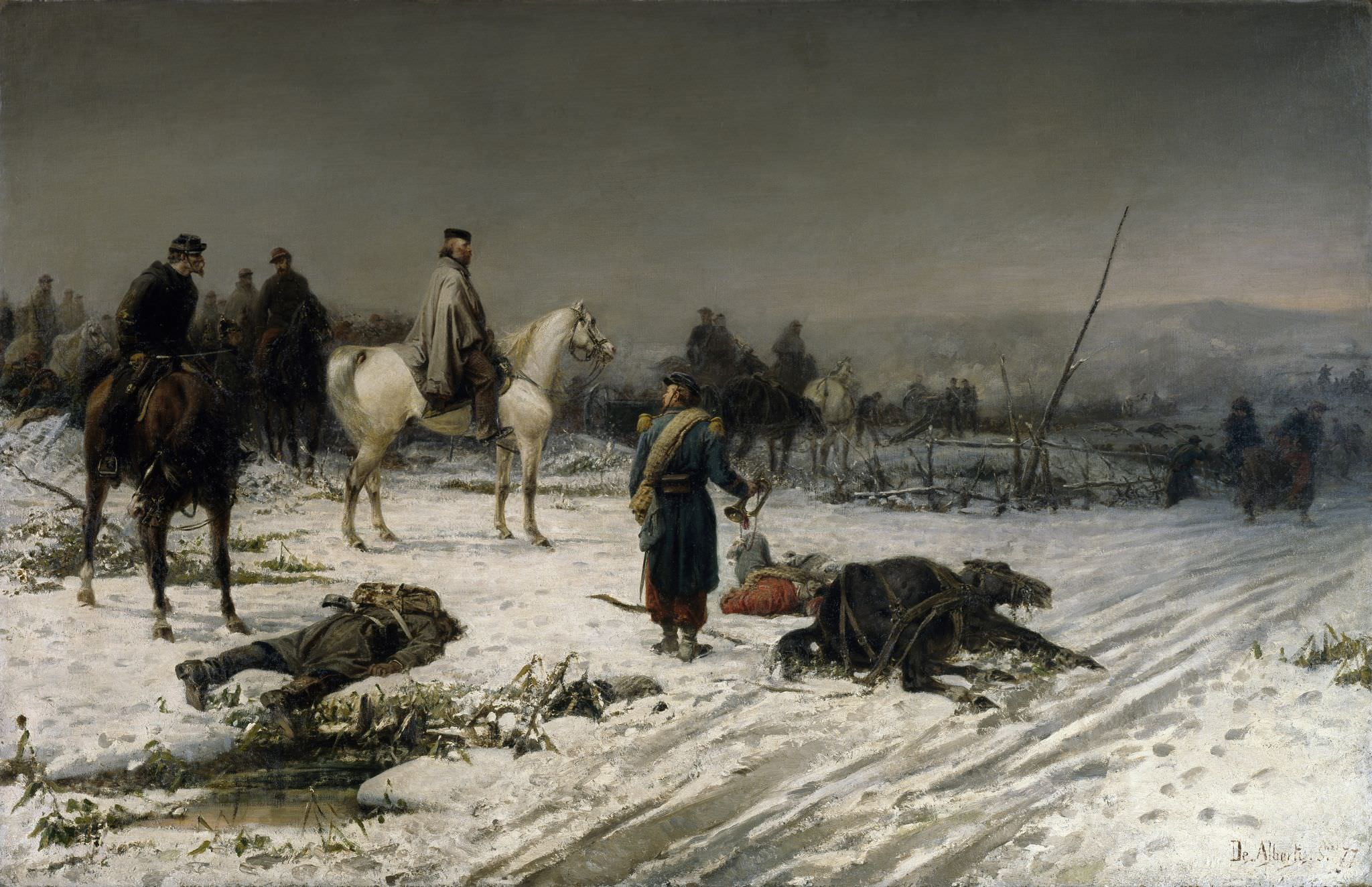
Garibaldi in Dijon during the Franco-Prussian War, painted in 1877

In the same year, Garibaldi sought international support for altogether eliminating the papacy. At the 1867 congress for the League of Peace and Freedom in Geneva he proposed: "The papacy, being the most harmful of all secret societies, ought to be abolished."

== Franco-Prussian War ==
When the Franco-Prussian War broke out in July 1870, Italian public opinion heavily favoured the Prussians, and many Italians attempted to sign up as volunteers at the Prussian embassy in Florence. After the French garrison was recalled from Rome, the Italian Army captured the Papal States without Garibaldi's assistance. Following the wartime collapse of the Second French Empire after the Battle of Sedan, Garibaldi, undaunted by the recent hostility shown to him by the men of Napoleon III, switched his support to the newly declared Government of National Defense of France. On 7 September 1870, within three days of the revolution in Paris that ended the Empire, he wrote to the Movimento of Genoa, "Yesterday I said to you: war to the death to Bonaparte. Today I say to you: rescue the French Republic by every means."

Subsequently, Garibaldi went to France and assumed command of the Army of the Vosges, an army of volunteers. French socialist Louis Blanc referred to Garibaldi as a "soldier of revolutionary cosmopolitanism" based on his support for liberation movements throughout the world. After the war he was elected to the French National Assembly, where he briefly served as a member of Parliament for Alpes-Maritimes before returning to Caprera.

== Involvement with the First International ==
When the Paris Commune erupted in 1871, Garibaldi joined with younger radicals such as Felice Cavallotti in declaring his full support for the Communards and internationalism. Garibaldi suggested a grand alliance between various factions of the left: "Why don't we pull together in one organized group the Freemasonry, democratic societies, workers' clubs, Rationalists, Mutual Aid, etc., which have the same tendency towards good?". He began organizing a Congress of Unity, which was supported by many of the radical, free-thinking, and socialist groups throughout Italy such as La Plebe. The Congress was held in the Teatro Argentina despite being banned by the government, and endorsed a set of radical policies including universal suffrage, progressive taxation, compulsory lay education, administrative reform, and abolition of the death penalty.

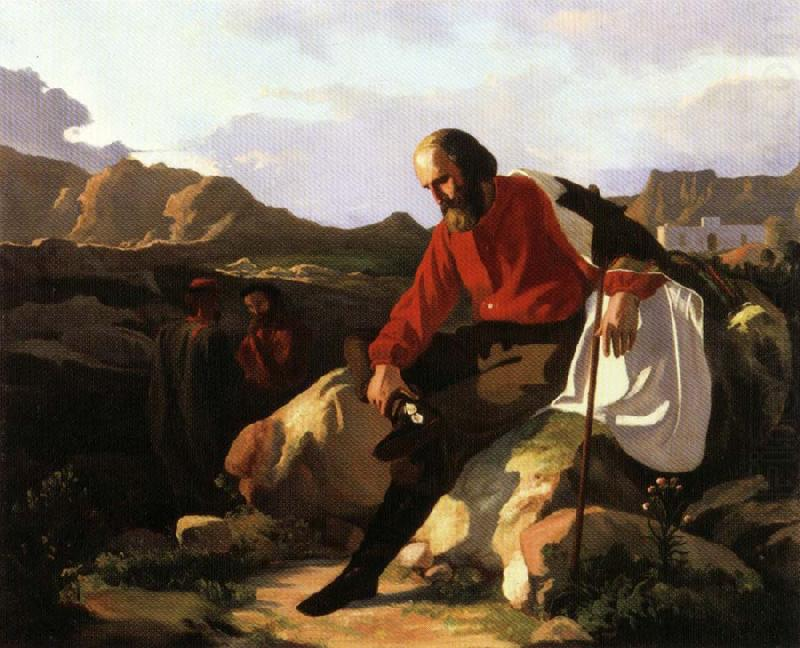
Garibaldi at Caprera

Garibaldi had long claimed an interest in vague ethical socialism such as that advanced by Henri Saint-Simon and saw the struggle for liberty as an international affair, one which "does not make any distinction between the African and the American, the European and the Asian, and therefore proclaims the fraternity of all men whatever nation they belong to". He interpreted the International Workingmen's Association as an extension of the humanitarian ideals for which he had always fought. Although he did not agree with their calls for the abolition of property, Garibaldi defended the Communards and the First International against the attacks of their enemies: "Is it not the product of the abnormal state in which society finds itself in the world? [...] Shouldn't a society (I mean a human society) in which the majority struggle for subsistence and the minority want to take the larger part of the product of the former through deceptions and violence but without hard work, arouse discontent and thoughts of revenge amongst those who suffer?".

Garibaldi wrote a letter to Celso Ceretti in which he declared: "The International is the sun of the future [sole dell'avvenire]!". The letter was printed in dozens of workers' news sheets and papers, and was instrumental in persuading many fence-sitters to join the organization. After Garibaldi's death, many of his disciples embraced the libertarian socialist ideas of Mikhail Bakunin. As Italy still lacked an industrial proletariat, "Garibaldi's socialism represented most accurately craft trade-unionism and a general focus on economic egalitarianism". His socialism was a "socialism wherein the struggle against every injustice, and a love for freedom, predominated. Garibaldi was not an unpractical man, but an active witness of that kind of generosity in feelings and firm wish for justice". In the first volume of Carl Landauer's European Socialism, Garibaldi is mentioned alongside Mazzini as outstanding "Italian revolutionaries".

According to Denis Mack Smith, "the difference is not so large when we find what Garibaldi meant by the term. Socialism for him was nothing very revolutionary, and perhaps he flaunted the word partly because he delighted to feel that it would shock the Mazzinians." In describing the move to the left of Garibaldi and the Mazzinians, Lucy Riall writes that this "emphasis by younger radicals on the 'social question' was paralleled by an increase in what was called 'internationalist' or socialist activity (mostly Bakuninist anarchism) throughout northern and southern Italy, which was given a big boost by the Paris Commune". The rise of this socialism "represented a genuine challenge to Mazzini and the Mazzinian emphasis on politics and culture; and Mazzinis' death early in 1872 only served to underline the prevailing sense that his political era was over. Garibaldi now broke definitively with Mazzini, and this time he moved to the left of him. He came out entirely in favour of the Paris Commune and internationalism, and his stance brought him much closer to the younger radicals, especially Felice Cavallotti, and gave him a new lease on political life. From his support was born an initiative to relaunch a broad party of the radical left."

Despite being elected again to the Italian parliament, first as part of the Historical Left and then of the Historical Far Left, Garibaldi spent much of his late years on Caprera. However, he still managed to serve the Italian parliament with extreme distinction and supported an ambitious project of land reclamation in the marshy areas of southern Lazio. In 1879, Garibaldi founded the League of Democracy, along with Cavallotti, Alberto Mario and Agostino Bertani, which reiterated his support for universal suffrage, abolition of ecclesiastical property, the legal and political emancipation of women and a plan of public works to improve the Roman countryside that was completed.

== On the Ottoman Empire ==
In a 6 October 1875 letter from Caprera, "To my brothers of the Herzegovina and to the oppressed of Eastern Europe", Garibaldi wrote:

The Turk must go away to Broussa. He descended like a wolf, passing the Bosphorus, devastating, murdering, and violating those populations who gave us the Pelasgi, who were, perhaps, the first civilisers of Europe. He must no longer tread upon that part of the world kept by him in misery. At Broussa, with his vices, depredations, and cruelties, he will find enough people of Asia Minor to torment and plunge into desolation. Rise, then, heroic sons of Montenegro, Herzegovina, Bosnia, Servia, Therapia, Macedonia, Greece, Epirus, Albania, Bulgaria, and Roumania! All of you have a most splendid history. Among you were born Leonidas, Achilles, Alexander, Scanderbeg, and Spartacus. And today even, among your robust populations, you may still find a Spartacus and a Leonidas. Do not trust to diplomacy. That old woman without a heart certainly deceives you. But with you are all the men of heart throughout the world. England herself, till today favourable to the Turks, has manifested to you by means of the obolus and sympathy of one of her great men that she ought to prefer the alliance and gratitude of a confederation of free peoples to the decrepit confederation of The Empire of the Crescent. Then to Broussa with the Turk! Only thus can you make yourself independent and free. On this side of the Bosphorus the fierce Ottoman will always be under the stimulant of eternal war, and you will never obtain the sacred rights of man.

== Death ==
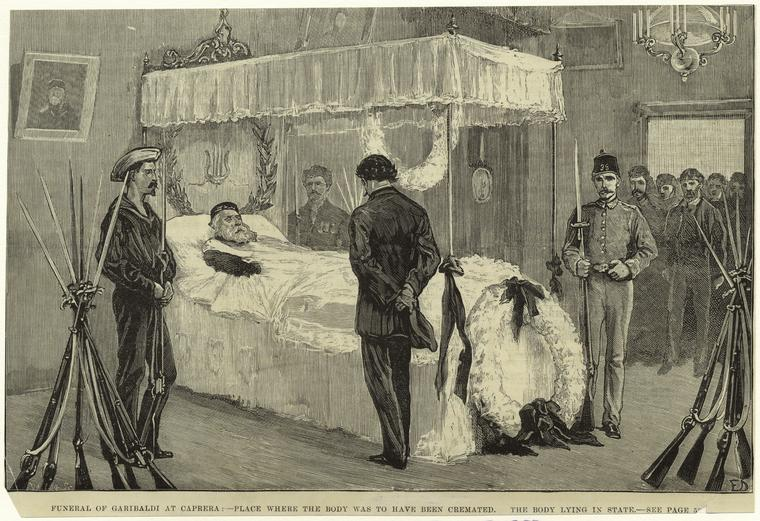
Funeral of Garibaldi

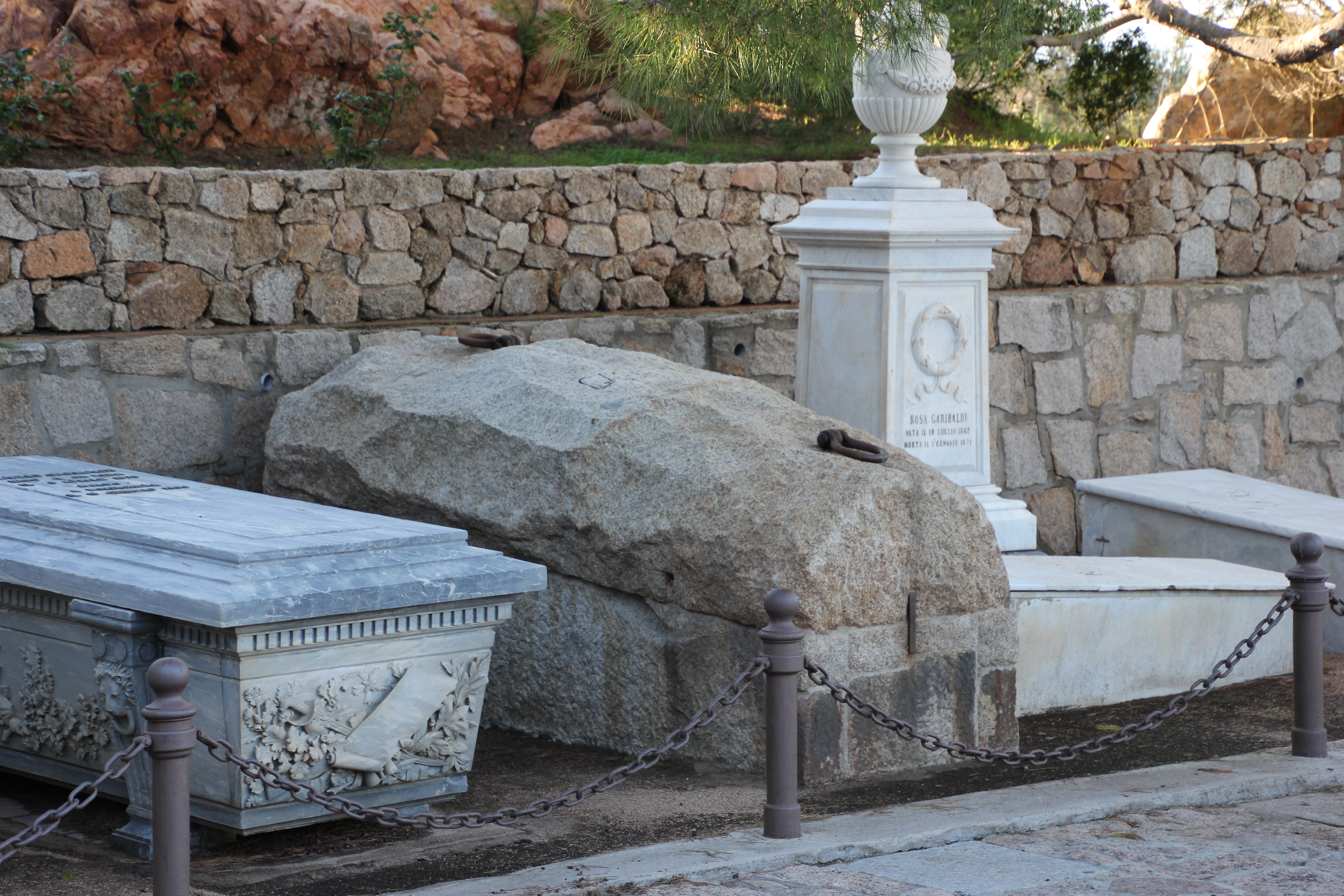
Tomb of Garibaldi at Caprera

Ill and confined to bed by arthritis, Garibaldi made trips to Calabria and Sicily. In 1880, he married Francesca Armosino, with whom he previously had three children. Before the wedding, he stated he was not a Catholic and was willing to become a Protestant. Though raised a Catholic, in later life he became a supporter of Freemasonry, abjured Christianity, and expressed religious positions reminiscent of deism. On his deathbed, Garibaldi asked for his bed to be moved to where he could view the sea. On his death on 2 June 1882, his wishes for a simple funeral and cremation were not respected. He was buried on his farm on the island of Caprera alongside his last wife and some of his children.

In 2012, Garibaldi's descendants announced that, with permission from authorities, they would have Garibaldi's remains exhumed to confirm through DNA analysis that the remains in the tomb are indeed Garibaldi's. Some anticipated that there would be a debate about whether to preserve the remains or to grant his final wish for a simple cremation. In 2013, personnel changes at the Ministry of Culture sidelined the exhumation plans. The new authorities were "less than enthusiastic" about the plan.

== Legacy ==
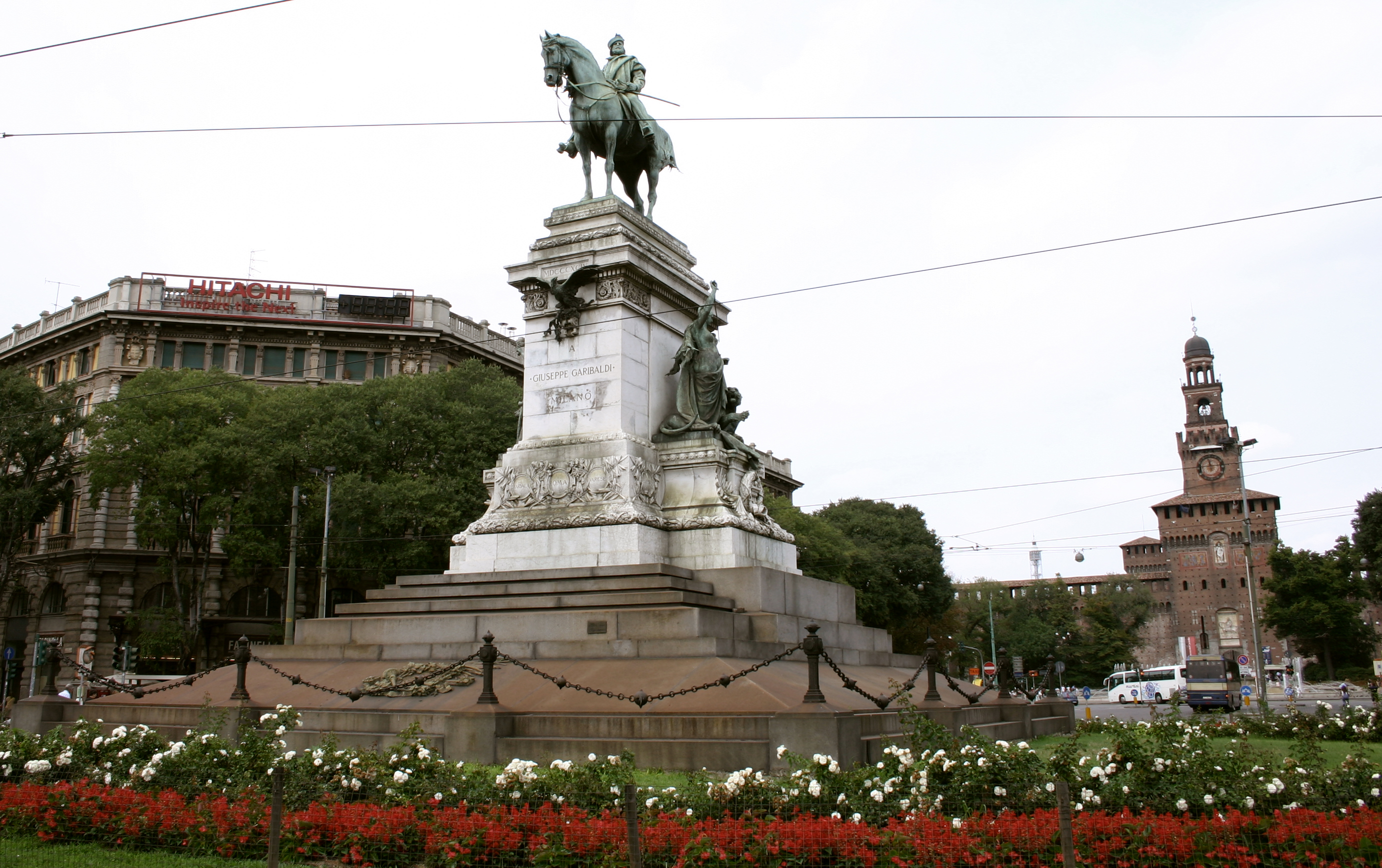
Garibaldi's statue in Milan before Castello Sforzesco

Garibaldi's popularity, skill at rousing the common people, and his military exploits are all credited with making the unification of Italy possible. He was also a global exemplar of mid-19th century revolutionary liberalism and nationalism. After the liberation of southern Italy from the Neapolitan monarchy in the Kingdom of the Two Sicilies, Garibaldi chose to sacrifice his liberal republican principles for the sake of unification. Garibaldi's acclaim stretched across Europe, with his name revered in Britain and France. His was the tale of an Italian vagabond trekking the South American plains from battle to battle with his pregnant wife in tow and then returning home and for the love of his homeland forsaking his ambition of making Italy a republic. His exploits became legendary, and when he toured Britain in his older days he was received as a hero.

Garibaldi subscribed to the anti-clericalism common among Latin liberals and did much to circumscribe the temporal power of the Papacy. His personal religious convictions are unclear to historians. In 1882, he wrote that "Man created God, not God created Man", yet he is quoted as saying in his autobiography: "I am a Christian and I speak to Christians—I am a good Christian and speak to good Christians. I love and venerate the religion of Christ because Christ came into the world to deliver humanity from slavery for which God has not created it. But the Pope, who wishes all men to be slaves—who demands of the powerful of the earth fetters and chains for Italians—the Pope king does not know Christ. He lies to his religion. Among the Indians, two geniuses are recognized and adored: that of good and that of evil. Well, the Genius of Evil for Italy is the Pope king. Let no one misunderstand my words—let no one confound Popery with Christianity—the Religion of Liberty with the avaricious and sanguinary Politics of Slavery. [...] You have the duty to educate the people—educate the people—educate them to be Christians—educate them to be Italians. [...] Viva l'Italia! Viva Christianity!".

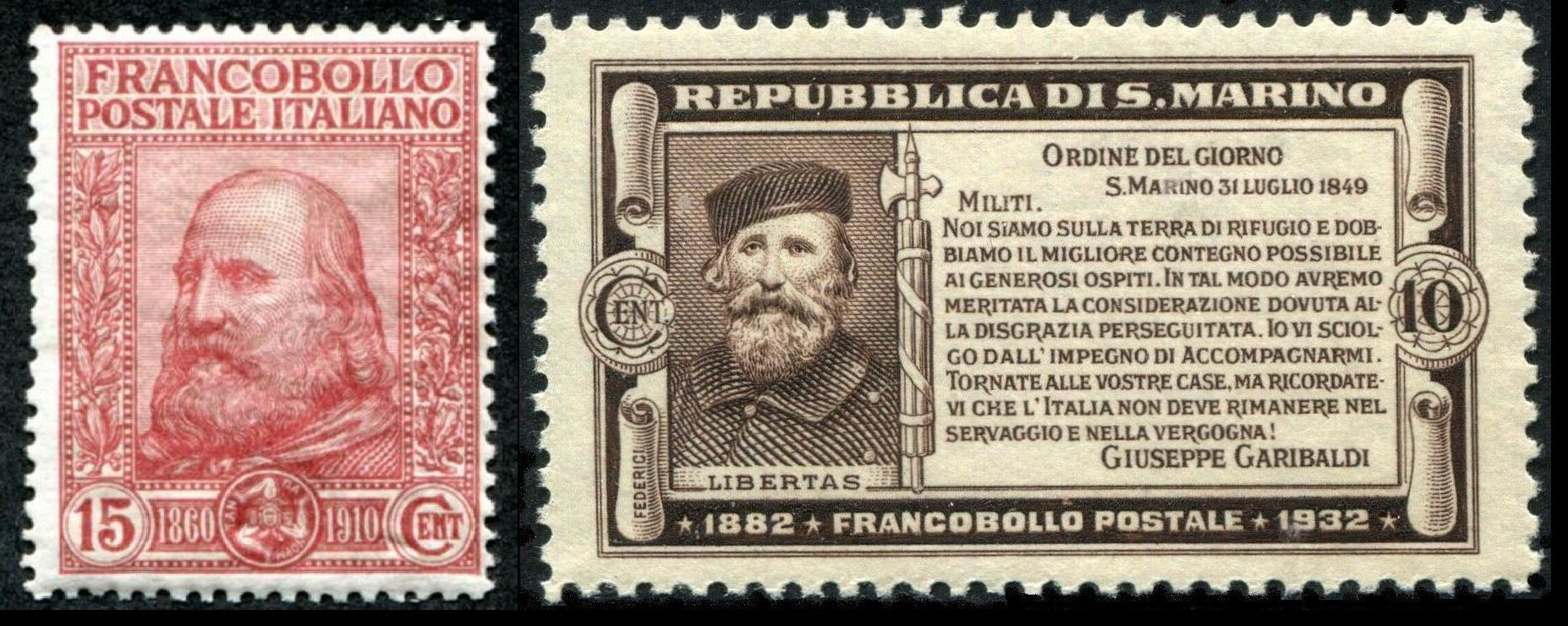
Italy stamp of 1910, part of a set & San Marino stamp of 1932, issued on the 50th anniversary of Garibaldi's death

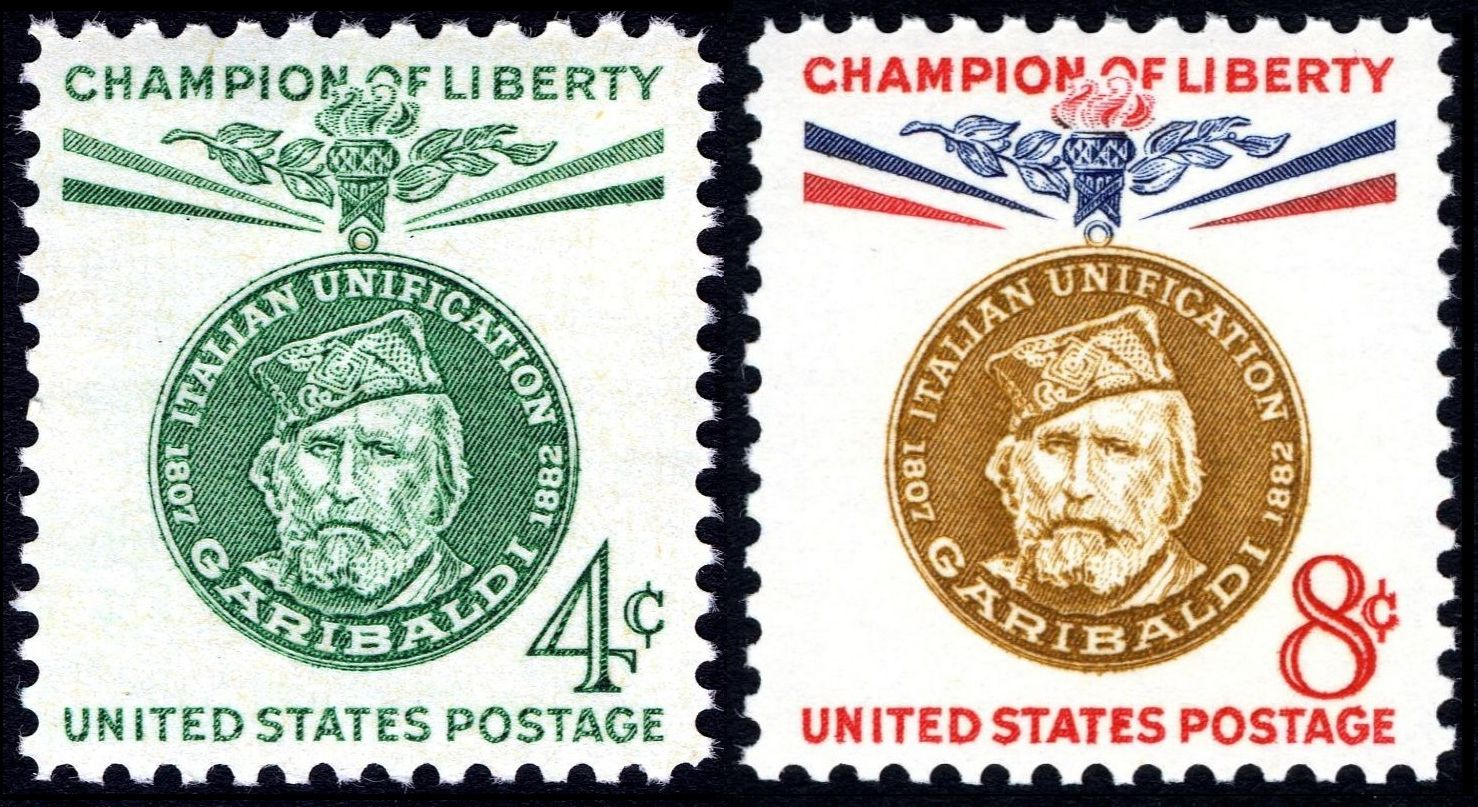
In 1960 the U.S. Government issued two commemorative stamps in honor of Garibaldi; part of the Champion of Liberty series

Garibaldi was a popular hero in Britain. In his review of Lucy Riall's Garibaldi biography for The New Yorker, Tim Parks cites the English historian A. J. P. Taylor as saying that "Garibaldi is the only wholly admirable figure in modern history". British historian Denis Mack Smith wrote:

At the height of glory, Giuseppe Garibaldi was perhaps the most famous person in Italy. His name was much more famous than that of Cavour and Mazzini, and many more people would have heard of him than Verdi or Manzoni. Abroad, Garibaldi symbolized the Risorgimento Italy of those dramatic years and the intrepid audacity that contributed so much to the formation of the Italian nation. [...] A professional liberator, he fought for the oppressed people wherever he found them. Despite having the temperament of the fighter and the man of action, he managed to be an idealist distinctly distinct from his colder-minded contemporaries. Everything he did, he did it with passionate conviction and unlimited enthusiasm; a career full of color and unexpected shows us one of the most romantic products of the time. Moreover, he was a lovable and charming person, of transparent honesty, who was obeyed without hesitation and for whom he died happy.

About G. M. Trevelyan's work on Garibaldi, David Cannadine wrote:

Trevelyan's great work was his Garibaldi trilogy (1907–11), which established his reputation as the outstanding literary historian of his generation. It depicted Garibaldi as a Carlylean hero—poet, patriot, and man of action—whose inspired leadership created the Italian nation. For Trevelyan, Garibaldi was the champion of freedom, progress, and tolerance, who vanquished the despotism, reaction, and obscurantism of the Austrian empire and the Neapolitan monarchy. The books were also notable for their vivid evocation of landscape (Trevelyan had himself followed the course of Garibaldi's marches), for their innovative use of documentary and oral sources, and for their spirited accounts of battles and military campaigns.

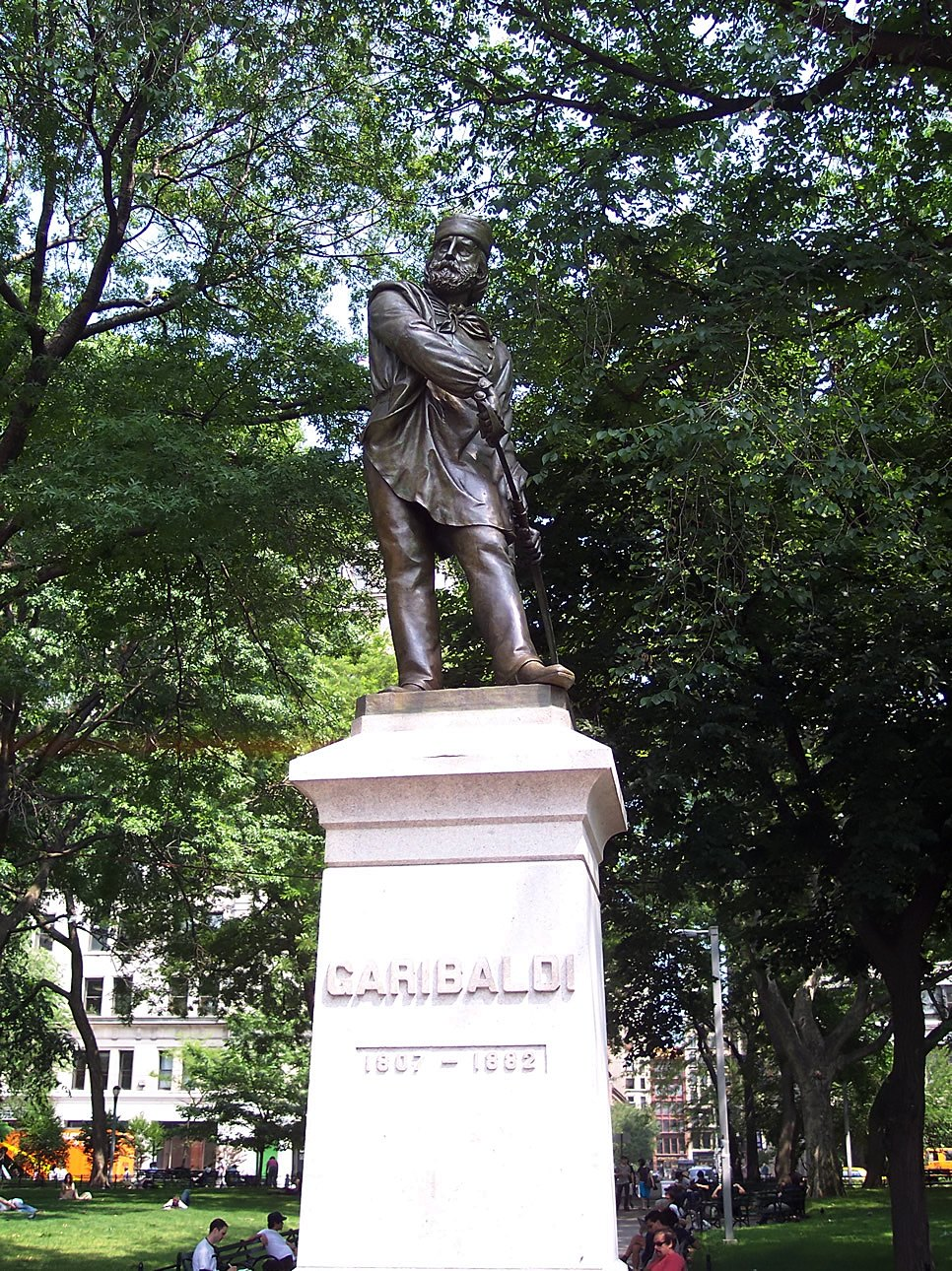
Statue of Garibaldi in Washington Square Park, New York City

Along with Giuseppe Mazzini and other Europeans, Garibaldi supported the creation of a European federation. Many Europeans expected that the 1871 unification of Germany would make Germany a European and world leader that would champion humanitarian policies. This idea is apparent in the following letter Garibaldi sent to Karl Blind on 10 April 1865:

The progress of humanity seems to have come to a halt, and you with your superior intelligence will know why. The reason is that the world lacks a nation which possesses true leadership. Such leadership, of course, is required not to dominate other peoples, but to lead them along the path of duty, to lead them toward the brotherhood of nations where all the barriers erected by egoism will be destroyed. We need the kind of leadership which, in the true tradition of medieval chivalry, would devote itself to redressing wrongs, supporting the weak, sacrificing momentary gains and material advantage for the much finer and more satisfying achievement of relieving the suffering of our fellow men. We need a nation courageous enough to give us a lead in this direction. It would rally to its cause all those who are suffering wrong or who aspire to a better life, and all those who are now enduring foreign oppression. This role of world leadership, left vacant as things are today, might well be occupied by the German nation. You Germans, with your grave and philosophic character, might well be the ones who could win the confidence of others and guarantee the future stability of the international community. Let us hope, then, that you can use your energy to overcome your moth-eaten thirty tyrants of the various German states. Let us hope that in the centre of Europe you can then make a unified nation out of your fifty million. All the rest of us would eagerly and joyfully follow you.

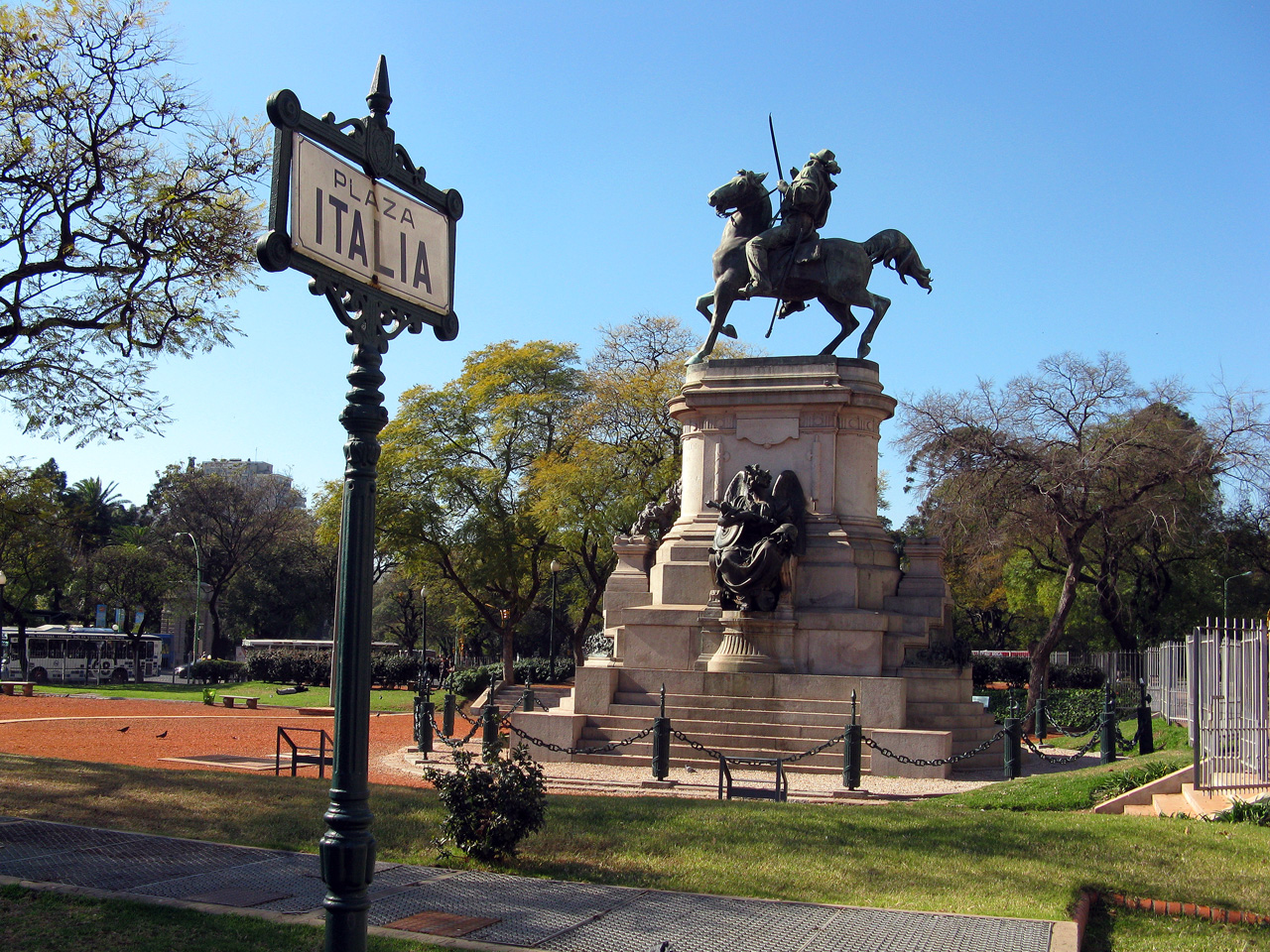
Giuseppe Garibaldi Statue in Buenos Aires, Argentina

Through the years, Garibaldi was showered with admiration and praises by many intellectuals and political figures. Francesco De Sanctis stated that "Garibaldi must win by force: he is not a man; he is a symbol, a form; he is the Italian soul. Between the beats of his heart, everyone hears the beats of his own." Admiral William Brown called him "the most generous of the pirates I have ever encountered". Argentine revolutionary Che Guevara stated: "The only hero the world has ever needed is called Giuseppe Garibaldi."

== Commemoration ==
Five ships of the Italian Navy have been named after him, including a World War II cruiser and the former flagship, the aircraft carrier Giuseppe Garibaldi.

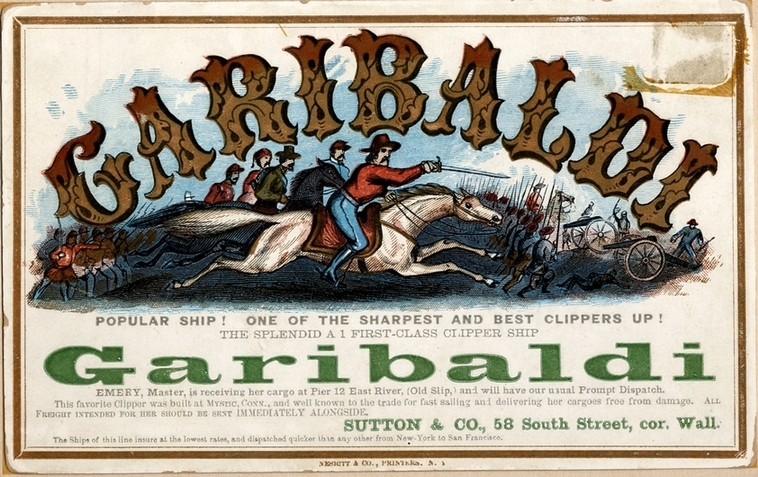
Clipper ship Garibaldi

Several worldwide military units have been named after Garibaldi, including the Polish Garibaldi Legion during the January Uprising and the French foreign Garibaldi Legion during World War I. The 39th New York Volunteer Infantry Regiment of the American Civil War was named Garibaldi Guard after him.

Statues of his likeness, such as the handshake of Teano, stand in many Italian squares, and in other countries around the world. There is a statue of Garibaldi on horseback on the top of the Janiculum hill in Rome; a Garibaldi Plaza and statue in Nice, France; and the Monumento a Giuseppe Garibaldi in Buenos Aires, Argentina. A bust of Giuseppe Garibaldi is prominently placed outside the entrance to the old Supreme Court Chamber in the United States Capitol Building in Washington, DC, a gift from members of the Italian Society of Washington.

Mount Garibaldi in the Garibaldi Ranges is a 2,678 metres (8,786 feet) dormant stratovolcano in southwestern British Columbia, Canada. Royal Navy Hydrographer George Richards named the mountain for Garibaldi during his survey of the area in 1860. The Squamish Nation has requested that Mount Garibaldi also be recognized by its indigenous name of Nch'ḵay̓.

Greek Freemasons, in order to honour Garibaldi's struggles for freedom and in commemoration of the Redshirts' assistance during the Greco-Turkish War (1897), the Balkan Wars and the First World War, established a Lodge named after the great patriot in 1980. Lodge Giuseppe Garibaldi (no. 130) is still active (as of 2026) and operates in Athens under the jurisdiction of the Grand Lodge of Greece. Founded as a benefit society in 1877, the Garibaldina Society in Los Angeles is currently the oldest active Italian American social organization in the United States.

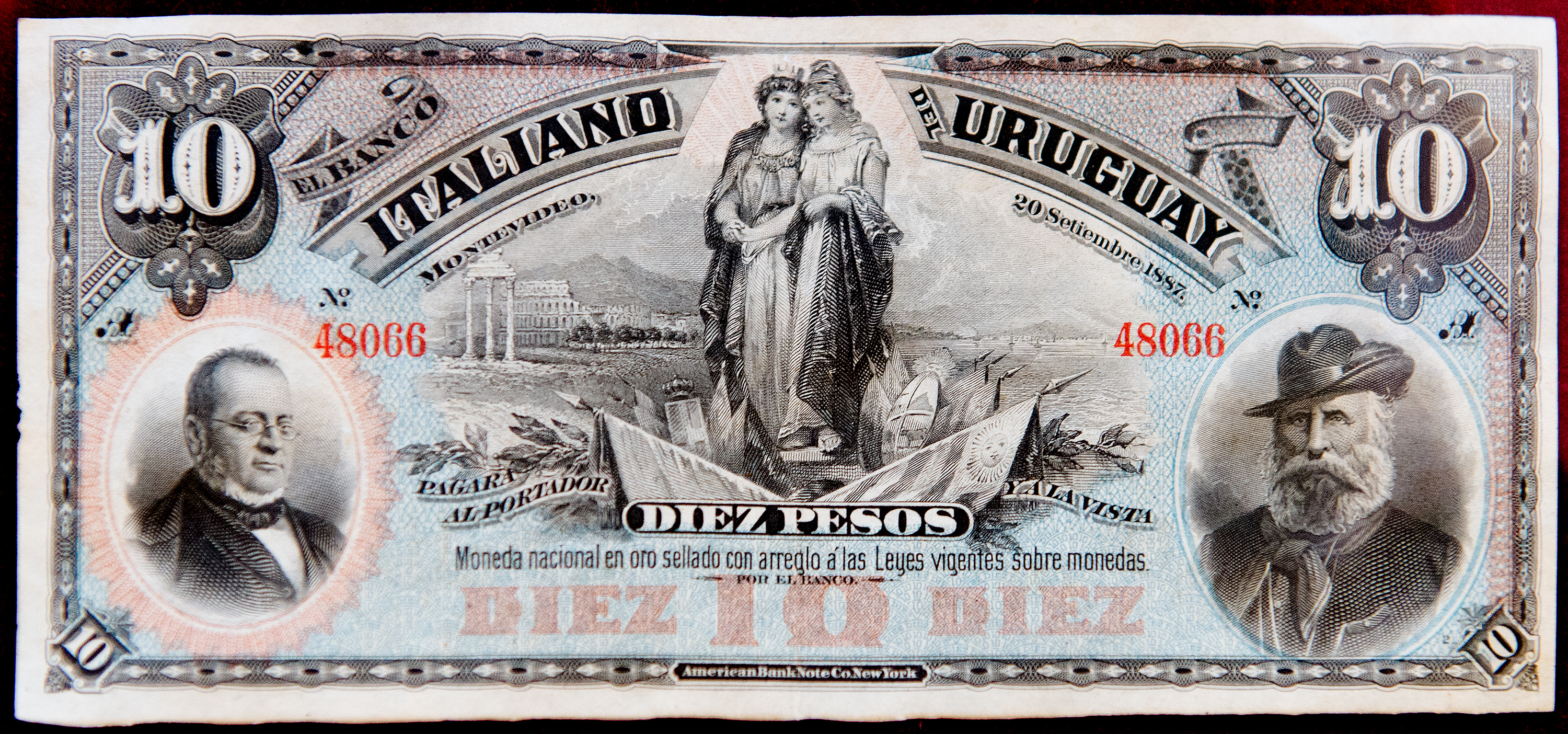
Ten-peso banknote, printed in Uruguay in 1887, with the image of Garibaldi (who is considered an important contributor towards the independence of Uruguay) and Camillo Benso

In 1865, the English football team Nottingham Forest chose their home colours from the uniform worn by Garibaldi and his men in 1865. The Garibaldi School in Mansfield, Nottinghamshire is also named after him.

A species of bright red-orange fish in the damselfish family received the vernacular name Garibaldi in honor of the Garibaldi red shirts. It was designated as California's state fish in 1995. Also, a species of hoverfly, Sphiximorpha garibaldii, was described from a specimen collected in Italy shortly after Garibaldi's victory in the Battle of Varese, and named in his honour.

The Giuseppe Garibaldi Trophy (Italian: Trofeo Garibaldi; French: Trophée Garibaldi) is a rugby union trophy awarded to the winner of the annual Six Nations Championship match between France and Italy.

The 19th century Garibaldi Inn in Sydney, Australia, is now a NSW State Heritage Registered property.. A public house in Bourne End, Buckinghamshire has been named The Garibaldi since at least 1876, after Garibaldi stayed in nearby Cliveden in 1864.

The Garibaldi Beard style is named after him.

== Family tree ==
Giuseppe Garibaldi	Ana Maria de Jesus Ribeiro da Silva
Domenico Menotti Garibaldi	Rosa "Rosita" Garibaldi	Teresa "Teresita" Garibaldi	Ricciotti Garibaldi	Harriet Constance Hopcraft
Peppino Garibaldi	Costante Garibaldi	Anita Italia Garibaldi	Ezio Garibaldi	Bruno Garibaldi	Ricciotti Garibaldi Jr.	Menotti Garibaldi Jr.	Sante Garibaldi

== Publications ==
Non-fiction

- Life. New York: Barnes. 1859. OCLC 670372674.
- Autobiography. London: Smith & Innes. 1889. OCLC 1069556440.
- My Life, translated by Stephen Parkin, foreword by Tim Parks. London: Hesperus Press Limited. 2004. ISBN 1-84391-093-4
- Autobiography of Giuseppe Garibaldi Vol. I, II, III, translated by Alica Werner. New York: Howard Fertig. 1971.

Fiction

- Cantoni il volontario. Milan: E. Politti. 1870. OCLC 36348294.
- The rule of the monk. London: Cassell, Petter and Galpin. 1870. OCLC 780147202.
- I mille (in Italian). Turin: Camilla e Bertolero. 1874. OCLC 1083429428.

== See also ==
- Capanno Garibaldi
- Unification of Italy
- Italian irredentism
- Giuseppe Mazzini

== Bibliography ==
- Anonymous (1893). "General Garibaldi (Obituary Notice, Friday, June 3, 1882)". Eminent Persons; Biographies reprinted from The Times. Vol. III (1882–1886). London and New York: Macmillan and Co & The Times Office. pp. 12–41 – via Internet Archive.
- Garibaldi, Giuseppe (1861). Dumas, Alexandre (ed.). Garibaldi: an autobiography. Translated by Robson, William. Routledge, Warne, and Routledge – via Internet Archive.
- Braun, Martin. "'Great Expectations': Cavour and Garibaldi: 1859–1959." History Today (Oct. 1959) 9#10 pp. 687–692, historiography
- Godkin, Georgina Sarah (1880). Life of Victor Emmanuel II, First King of Italy. London: Macmillan and co. OCLC 265781.
- Gay, H. Nelson, "Lincoln's Offer of a Command to Garibaldi: Light on a Disputed Point of History", The Century Magazine LXXV (Nov. 1907): 66
- Hibbert, Christopher. Garibaldi and His Enemies: The Clash of Arms and Personalities in the Making of Italy (1965), a standard biography.
- Hughes-Hallett, Lucy (2004). Heroes: A History of Hero Worship. New York: Alfred A. Knopf. ISBN 1-4000-4399-9. pp. 332–416.
- Mack Smith, Denis, ed. Garibaldi (Great Lives Observed), Englewood Cliffs, NJ: Prentice-Hall, Inc. (primary and secondary sources)
- Mack Smith, Denis. "Giuseppe Garibaldi: 1807–1882". History Today (March 1956) 5 #3 pp. 188–196.
- Mack Smith, Denis. Garibaldi: A Great Life in Brief (1956) online
- Mack Smith, Denis (1985). Cavour and Garibaldi 1860: A Study in Political Conflict. Cambridge: Cambridge University Press. ISBN 978-0-52131-637-8.
- Marraro, Howard R. "Lincoln's Offer of a Command to Garibaldi: Further Light on a Disputed Point of History." Journal of the Illinois State Historical Society 36 #3 (Sept. 1943): 237–270
- Parks, Tim. The Hero's Way: Walking With Garibaldi From Rome to Ravenna (W. W. Norton & Company, Inc., 2021), travelogue in which Parks and his partner retrace Garibaldi and the Garibaldini's 1849 march.
- Parks, Tim. Across Sicily with Garibaldi's Thousand: An Adventure in Landscape and Italian Memory (Alma Books, 2026).
- Parris, John. The Lion of Caprera: A Biography of Giuseppe Garibaldi (Arthur Barker, 1962).
- Riall, Lucy. The Italian Risorgimento: State, Society, and National Unification (Routledge, 1994) online
- Riall, Lucy. Garibaldi: Invention of a Hero (Yale University Press, 2007).
- Riall, Lucy. "Hero, saint or revolutionary? Nineteenth-century politics and the cult of Garibaldi." Modern Italy 3.02 (1998): 191–204.
- Riall, Lucy. "Travel, migration, exile: Garibaldi's global fame." Modern Italy 19.1 (2014): 41–52.
- Ridley, Jasper. Garibaldi (1974), a standard biography online
- Ridley, Nicholas (2024). Carlo Di Rudio and the Age of Revolution. New York: Routledge. ISBN 978-1-00382-377-3.
- Schneid, Frederick (2012). The Second War of Italian Unification 1859-61. Oxford: Osprey Publishing. ISBN 978-1-84908-787-2.
- Trevelyan, George Macaulay (1909). Garibaldi and the Thousand: May 1860.
- Trevelyan, George Macaulay (1911). Garibaldi and the Making of Italy. London: Longmans, Green and Co.
- Trevelyan, George Macaulay (1919). Garibaldi's Defence of the Roman Republic: 1848–9.
