= Itapirubá =

Settlement in Brazil

Coordinates: 28°19′55″S 48°42′37″W

Itapirubá is a settlement in Imbituba, state of Santa Catarina, Brazil, sharing borders with Laguna. It is close to historical cities like Laguna, Imbituba and other sights. Itapirubá has beautiful beaches, dunes and a lake. There are two beaches separated by a hill; from the hill a headland and the island Ilha das Araras can be seen. The clear waters around the island are a popular fishing and diving location.

Itapirubá's name is a translation from an Indian word, meaning "stones that roll to the water".
