= Battle of Imbituba =

1839 battle of the Ragamuffin War

- Part of the Ragamuffin War
Date	3–5 November 1839
Location	Imbituba, Santa Catarina, Empire of Brazil
Result	Imperial victory

Belligerents
Juliana Republic	Empire of Brazil

Commanders and leaders
Giuseppe Garibaldi; Teixeira Nunes	Francisco Romano da Silva

Strength
200 men 3 schooners 1 pilot boat Total guns: 2	2 pataches 1 schooner Total guns: 10

Casualties and losses
1 schooner sunk	1 schooner damaged

The Battle of Imbituba was a naval battle between the rebel Juliana Republic and the Empire of Brazil during the Ragamuffin War, taking place on 4 November 1839 in Imbituba in Santa Catarina. The rebel flotilla was forced to withdraw by the superior Imperial flotilla, setting one of its own ships on fire and leaving while the Imperials were distracted.

== Background ==
The Ragamuffin War had been going on since 1835 and the recently created Juliana Republic was being attacked by superior forces from the Empire of Brazil. The Republic controlled a relatively small area around the city of Laguna, its capital, and had a small fleet.

Giuseppe Garibaldi, sailing back from a raiding expedition in São Paulo's coast, was met first by the Imperial patache Andorinha, which managed to recapture two of the ships the expedition had seized, and then by two others, the patache Patagônia and the schooner Bela Americana; this fleet, under Francisco Romano da Silva, made the flotilla from the Juliana Republic fight them at Imbituba. The Republicans also had the aid of 200 riflemen on land.

== Engagement ==
The fighting lasted for four hours during the afternoon of the 3rd of November, inconclusively, but the Imperial force set up a blockade, keeping them from withdrawing. On the 4th there was renewed fighting, and on the 5th, Garibaldi ordered his schooner Bizarria to be set on fire, and, under the confusion this caused, managed to run through the blockade with the schooners Seival and Rio Pardo, which would then go to Laguna where the Juliana Republic would be decisively defeated by Imperial forces some days later.

Garibaldi was accompanied by his future wife, Anita, throughout the battle. Regarding her participation, Garibaldi wrote the following: "During that fight, I tasted the most vivid and cruel emotion of my life. While Anita, over the ship's prow, with a saber in her hand, encouraged our sailors, a cannonball drove two of them into the ground. I jumped towards her, thinking I would find a dead body; instead, she got up quickly, safe and sound, while the two men who fell down with her were dead. I ordered her to go down inside the ship. 'Yes, I will', she answered, 'but to bring outside the cowards who hid there'." (Note: This is a translation from the original Portuguese, which reads: Durante aquela luta, provei a mais viva e cruel emoção de minha vida. Enquanto Anita, sobre a proa do barco, com o sabre na mão, encorajava nossos marinheiros, uma bala de canhão arremessou ao chão outros dois. Dei um salto para junto dela, pensando encontrar um cadáver; ao invés, ela se levantou rapidamente, sã e salva, enquanto os dois homens caídos com ela estavam mortos. Dei-lhe ordem para descer ao interior do barco. 'Sim, desço', me respondeu, 'mas para trazer fora os covardes que ali se esconderam.'")

== Aftermath ==
On 4 November 2019, on the 180th anniversary of the battle, near where it took place in Praia do Porto, Imbituba, a monument was unveiled to commemorate Anita Garibaldi's baptism of fire, featuring a bust of her.
