= Imbituba =

Coastal Town In Brazil

- Municipality
- Municipality of Imbituba
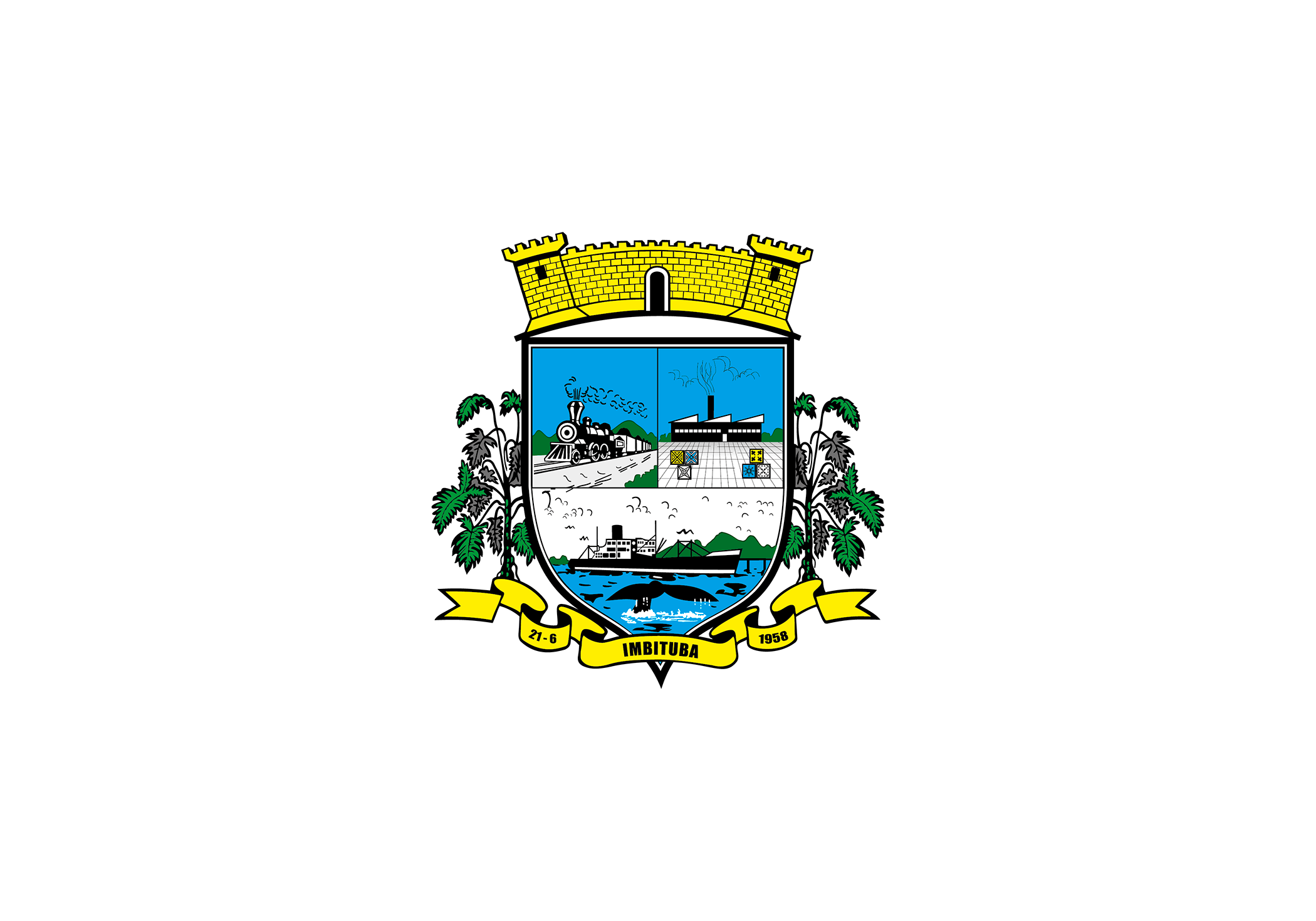
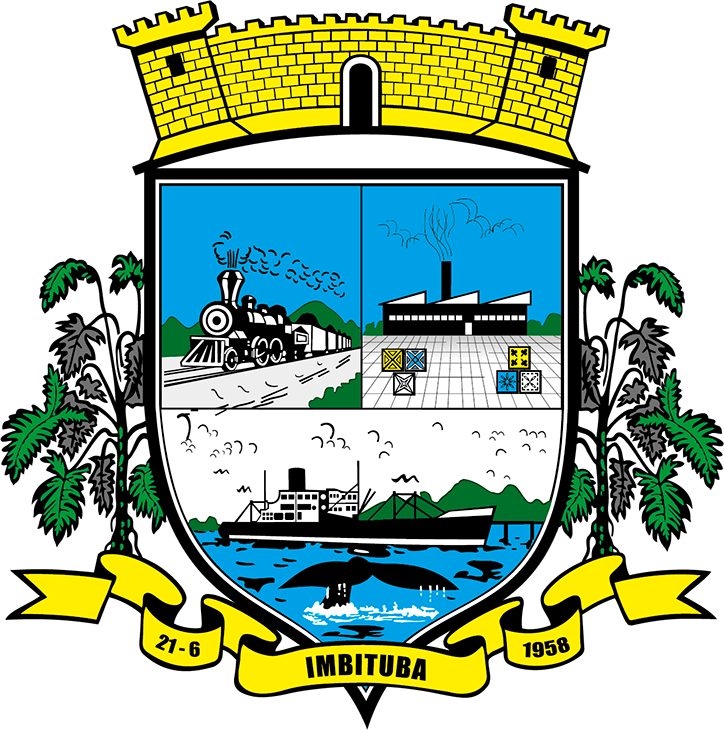
- Flag Coat of arms

- Location within Brazil
- Coordinates: 28°14′21″S 48°40′03″W
- Country: Brazil
- Region: South
- State: Santa Catarina
- Founded: August 30, 1923

Government
  - Mayor: Rosenvaldo da Silva Júnior
- Postal code: 88780-000
- Website: imbituba.sc.gov.br

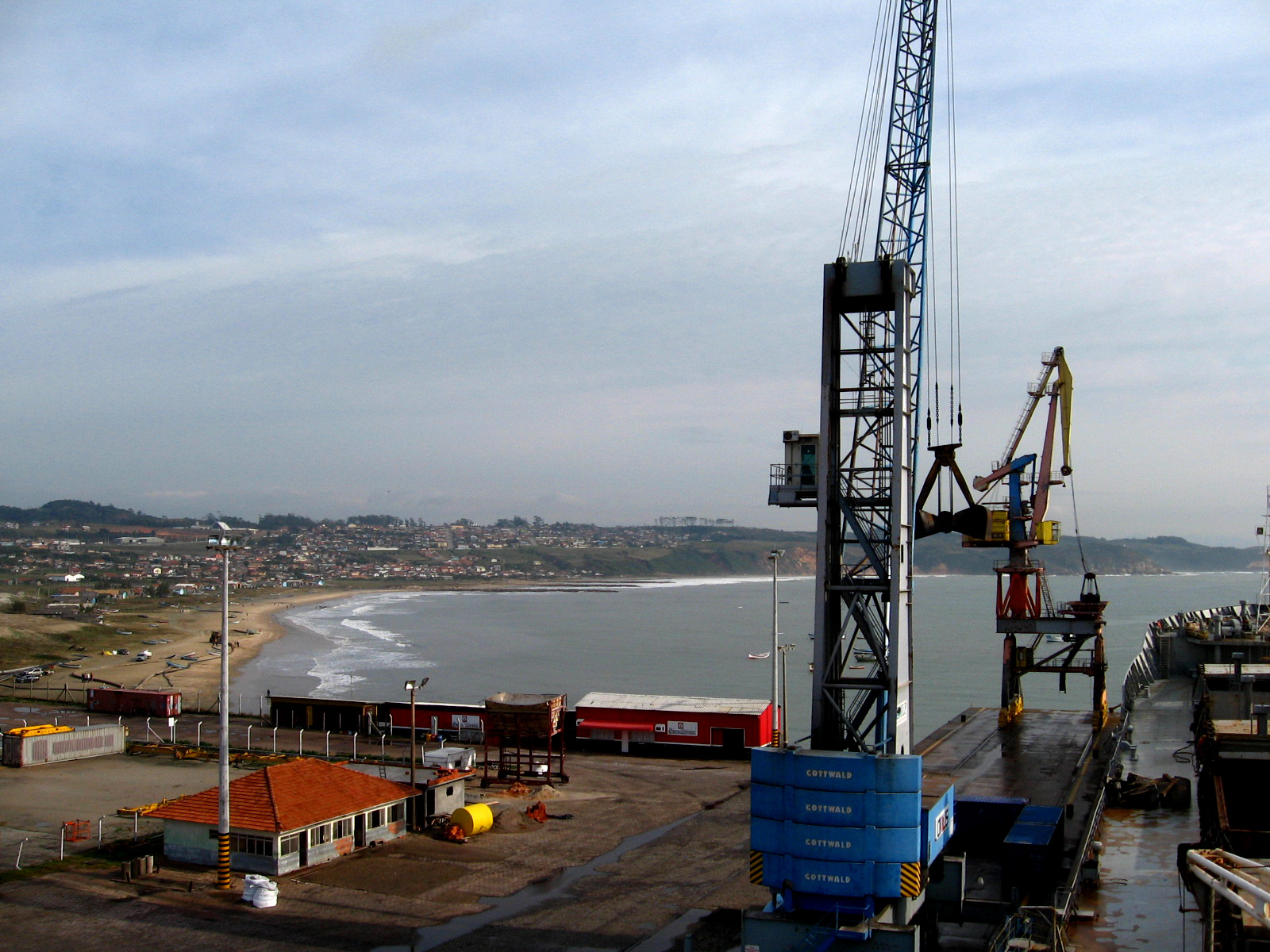
View of Imbituba coast.

Imbituba is a port and coastal town in the southern Brazil state of Santa Catarina. As of 2020, it has an estimated population of 45,286. It is also home to a population of Portuguese, Italian, and German descent, and it is about one hour drive from Florianópolis, the capital of Santa Catarina.

== Whaling ==
Up until the mid‑20th century Imbituba was an important home of Brazilian whalers since 1796, when the southernmost whaling station in Brazil was established there to prey on right whales. Today, the rebuilt whaling station is a historic site and museum managed by the internationally acclaimed Brazilian Right Whale Project (Projeto Baleia Franca), based in nearby Itapirubá at the National Right Whale Conservation Center. The Project has worked for the recovery of this endangered whale species since 1982. Right whales visit Imbituba, Itapirubá and Ibiraquera/Ribanceira beaches in winter and spring to mate, give birth and nurse their calves. Thanks to the work of the Right Whale Project, this region has become a federal Environmental Protection Area currently under implementation.

== Infrastructure ==
The Port of Imbituba is currently the only privately operated port in Brazil. As part of Brazil's plan to modernize its port infrastructure, it plans to invest in the Port of Imbituba and transform it into one of Brazil's most prominent ports such as the Port of Santos. As part of this initiative, the government also plans on upgrading routes that lead to the port itself such as roads and railroads, as well as integrating the various transport modes. The Santa Catarina investments put the port as first priority of the city, which some see as unfortunate as tourism should also be given adequate priority due to the regional potential of activities like ecotourism and visits to historical sites. Imbituba is now one of the homes for WCT worldwide surfing championships.

Imbituba has stocks in the Brazilian capital market, Bovespa; the codes of the stocks are imbi4 and imbi3.

== People ==
- Jorginho, Italian-Brazilian footballer

== See also ==
- Battle of Imbituba
